

171001–171100 

|-bgcolor=#E9E9E9
| 171001 ||  || — || March 3, 2005 || Kitt Peak || Spacewatch || — || align=right | 3.6 km || 
|-id=002 bgcolor=#E9E9E9
| 171002 ||  || — || March 3, 2005 || Kitt Peak || Spacewatch || — || align=right | 1.7 km || 
|-id=003 bgcolor=#E9E9E9
| 171003 ||  || — || March 3, 2005 || Catalina || CSS || — || align=right | 2.8 km || 
|-id=004 bgcolor=#fefefe
| 171004 ||  || — || March 3, 2005 || Catalina || CSS || NYS || align=right | 1.2 km || 
|-id=005 bgcolor=#E9E9E9
| 171005 ||  || — || March 3, 2005 || Catalina || CSS || — || align=right | 2.6 km || 
|-id=006 bgcolor=#fefefe
| 171006 ||  || — || March 3, 2005 || Catalina || CSS || MAS || align=right data-sort-value="0.95" | 950 m || 
|-id=007 bgcolor=#fefefe
| 171007 ||  || — || March 3, 2005 || Catalina || CSS || — || align=right | 1.6 km || 
|-id=008 bgcolor=#E9E9E9
| 171008 ||  || — || March 3, 2005 || Catalina || CSS || — || align=right | 2.8 km || 
|-id=009 bgcolor=#fefefe
| 171009 ||  || — || March 2, 2005 || Kitt Peak || Spacewatch || — || align=right | 1.6 km || 
|-id=010 bgcolor=#fefefe
| 171010 ||  || — || March 3, 2005 || Catalina || CSS || ERI || align=right | 3.0 km || 
|-id=011 bgcolor=#fefefe
| 171011 ||  || — || March 4, 2005 || Socorro || LINEAR || NYS || align=right data-sort-value="0.92" | 920 m || 
|-id=012 bgcolor=#E9E9E9
| 171012 ||  || — || March 4, 2005 || Socorro || LINEAR || — || align=right | 2.3 km || 
|-id=013 bgcolor=#E9E9E9
| 171013 ||  || — || March 4, 2005 || Mount Lemmon || Mount Lemmon Survey || — || align=right | 3.0 km || 
|-id=014 bgcolor=#fefefe
| 171014 ||  || — || March 4, 2005 || Kitt Peak || Spacewatch || — || align=right | 1.5 km || 
|-id=015 bgcolor=#E9E9E9
| 171015 ||  || — || March 8, 2005 || RAS || A. Lowe || — || align=right | 1.7 km || 
|-id=016 bgcolor=#E9E9E9
| 171016 ||  || — || March 1, 2005 || Kitt Peak || Spacewatch || — || align=right | 3.9 km || 
|-id=017 bgcolor=#fefefe
| 171017 ||  || — || March 3, 2005 || Kitt Peak || Spacewatch || NYS || align=right | 2.7 km || 
|-id=018 bgcolor=#fefefe
| 171018 ||  || — || March 3, 2005 || Catalina || CSS || NYS || align=right | 1.1 km || 
|-id=019 bgcolor=#fefefe
| 171019 ||  || — || March 3, 2005 || Catalina || CSS || NYS || align=right | 1.0 km || 
|-id=020 bgcolor=#fefefe
| 171020 ||  || — || March 3, 2005 || Catalina || CSS || — || align=right | 1.2 km || 
|-id=021 bgcolor=#fefefe
| 171021 ||  || — || March 3, 2005 || Catalina || CSS || MAS || align=right | 1.4 km || 
|-id=022 bgcolor=#fefefe
| 171022 ||  || — || March 3, 2005 || Catalina || CSS || NYS || align=right data-sort-value="0.91" | 910 m || 
|-id=023 bgcolor=#fefefe
| 171023 ||  || — || March 3, 2005 || Catalina || CSS || — || align=right | 1.2 km || 
|-id=024 bgcolor=#E9E9E9
| 171024 ||  || — || March 3, 2005 || Kitt Peak || Spacewatch || — || align=right | 1.4 km || 
|-id=025 bgcolor=#E9E9E9
| 171025 ||  || — || March 3, 2005 || Catalina || CSS || NEM || align=right | 4.0 km || 
|-id=026 bgcolor=#fefefe
| 171026 ||  || — || March 4, 2005 || Kitt Peak || Spacewatch || — || align=right | 1.3 km || 
|-id=027 bgcolor=#fefefe
| 171027 ||  || — || March 4, 2005 || Mount Lemmon || Mount Lemmon Survey || CLA || align=right | 4.6 km || 
|-id=028 bgcolor=#fefefe
| 171028 ||  || — || March 4, 2005 || Mount Lemmon || Mount Lemmon Survey || — || align=right | 1.8 km || 
|-id=029 bgcolor=#fefefe
| 171029 ||  || — || March 4, 2005 || Mount Lemmon || Mount Lemmon Survey || NYS || align=right data-sort-value="0.83" | 830 m || 
|-id=030 bgcolor=#E9E9E9
| 171030 ||  || — || March 4, 2005 || Catalina || CSS || — || align=right | 2.7 km || 
|-id=031 bgcolor=#fefefe
| 171031 ||  || — || March 4, 2005 || Catalina || CSS || — || align=right | 1.3 km || 
|-id=032 bgcolor=#E9E9E9
| 171032 ||  || — || March 4, 2005 || Socorro || LINEAR || — || align=right | 1.5 km || 
|-id=033 bgcolor=#fefefe
| 171033 ||  || — || March 4, 2005 || Mount Lemmon || Mount Lemmon Survey || — || align=right | 1.1 km || 
|-id=034 bgcolor=#E9E9E9
| 171034 ||  || — || March 4, 2005 || Catalina || CSS || EUN || align=right | 2.4 km || 
|-id=035 bgcolor=#fefefe
| 171035 ||  || — || March 2, 2005 || Catalina || CSS || — || align=right | 1.5 km || 
|-id=036 bgcolor=#fefefe
| 171036 ||  || — || March 2, 2005 || Catalina || CSS || — || align=right | 1.3 km || 
|-id=037 bgcolor=#fefefe
| 171037 ||  || — || March 2, 2005 || Catalina || CSS || V || align=right | 1.1 km || 
|-id=038 bgcolor=#fefefe
| 171038 ||  || — || March 3, 2005 || Kitt Peak || Spacewatch || MAS || align=right data-sort-value="0.72" | 720 m || 
|-id=039 bgcolor=#E9E9E9
| 171039 ||  || — || March 3, 2005 || Catalina || CSS || — || align=right | 3.6 km || 
|-id=040 bgcolor=#fefefe
| 171040 ||  || — || March 3, 2005 || Catalina || CSS || — || align=right | 1.2 km || 
|-id=041 bgcolor=#fefefe
| 171041 ||  || — || March 4, 2005 || Socorro || LINEAR || NYS || align=right | 1.1 km || 
|-id=042 bgcolor=#E9E9E9
| 171042 ||  || — || March 4, 2005 || Socorro || LINEAR || — || align=right | 1.2 km || 
|-id=043 bgcolor=#E9E9E9
| 171043 ||  || — || March 8, 2005 || Anderson Mesa || LONEOS || — || align=right | 2.3 km || 
|-id=044 bgcolor=#E9E9E9
| 171044 ||  || — || March 8, 2005 || Socorro || LINEAR || MAR || align=right | 1.9 km || 
|-id=045 bgcolor=#E9E9E9
| 171045 ||  || — || March 3, 2005 || Catalina || CSS || — || align=right | 2.0 km || 
|-id=046 bgcolor=#fefefe
| 171046 ||  || — || March 3, 2005 || Catalina || CSS || — || align=right | 1.3 km || 
|-id=047 bgcolor=#d6d6d6
| 171047 ||  || — || March 3, 2005 || Catalina || CSS || — || align=right | 5.1 km || 
|-id=048 bgcolor=#E9E9E9
| 171048 ||  || — || March 3, 2005 || $¢£t || CSS || — || align=right | 4.6 km || 
|-id=049 bgcolor=#E9E9E9
| 171049 ||  || — || March 3, 2005 || Kitt Peak || Spacewatch || — || align=right | 1.7 km || 
|-id=050 bgcolor=#E9E9E9
| 171050 ||  || — || March 4, 2005 || Catalina || CSS || MAR || align=right | 1.9 km || 
|-id=051 bgcolor=#fefefe
| 171051 ||  || — || March 4, 2005 || Catalina || CSS || — || align=right | 2.7 km || 
|-id=052 bgcolor=#E9E9E9
| 171052 ||  || — || March 4, 2005 || Mount Lemmon || Mount Lemmon Survey || — || align=right | 1.3 km || 
|-id=053 bgcolor=#E9E9E9
| 171053 ||  || — || March 4, 2005 || Mount Lemmon || Mount Lemmon Survey || — || align=right | 1.8 km || 
|-id=054 bgcolor=#E9E9E9
| 171054 ||  || — || March 4, 2005 || Mount Lemmon || Mount Lemmon Survey || WIT || align=right | 1.1 km || 
|-id=055 bgcolor=#fefefe
| 171055 ||  || — || March 8, 2005 || Anderson Mesa || LONEOS || NYS || align=right data-sort-value="0.92" | 920 m || 
|-id=056 bgcolor=#d6d6d6
| 171056 ||  || — || March 8, 2005 || Socorro || LINEAR || ELF || align=right | 5.4 km || 
|-id=057 bgcolor=#E9E9E9
| 171057 ||  || — || March 8, 2005 || Anderson Mesa || LONEOS || MIS || align=right | 2.2 km || 
|-id=058 bgcolor=#E9E9E9
| 171058 ||  || — || March 8, 2005 || Socorro || LINEAR || — || align=right | 2.2 km || 
|-id=059 bgcolor=#E9E9E9
| 171059 ||  || — || March 8, 2005 || Mount Lemmon || Mount Lemmon Survey || — || align=right | 2.7 km || 
|-id=060 bgcolor=#E9E9E9
| 171060 ||  || — || March 8, 2005 || Socorro || LINEAR || GAL || align=right | 2.6 km || 
|-id=061 bgcolor=#fefefe
| 171061 ||  || — || March 8, 2005 || Mount Lemmon || Mount Lemmon Survey || MAS || align=right data-sort-value="0.75" | 750 m || 
|-id=062 bgcolor=#fefefe
| 171062 ||  || — || March 9, 2005 || Kitt Peak || Spacewatch || V || align=right | 1.0 km || 
|-id=063 bgcolor=#E9E9E9
| 171063 ||  || — || March 9, 2005 || Socorro || LINEAR || — || align=right | 1.4 km || 
|-id=064 bgcolor=#fefefe
| 171064 ||  || — || March 9, 2005 || Anderson Mesa || LONEOS || — || align=right | 1.4 km || 
|-id=065 bgcolor=#fefefe
| 171065 ||  || — || March 9, 2005 || Socorro || LINEAR || — || align=right | 1.3 km || 
|-id=066 bgcolor=#E9E9E9
| 171066 ||  || — || March 10, 2005 || Catalina || CSS || — || align=right | 4.6 km || 
|-id=067 bgcolor=#fefefe
| 171067 ||  || — || March 10, 2005 || Kitt Peak || Spacewatch || NYS || align=right | 1.1 km || 
|-id=068 bgcolor=#d6d6d6
| 171068 ||  || — || March 10, 2005 || Kitt Peak || Spacewatch || — || align=right | 4.6 km || 
|-id=069 bgcolor=#d6d6d6
| 171069 ||  || — || March 10, 2005 || Kitt Peak || Spacewatch || KOR || align=right | 2.3 km || 
|-id=070 bgcolor=#E9E9E9
| 171070 ||  || — || March 9, 2005 || Catalina || CSS || GEF || align=right | 2.3 km || 
|-id=071 bgcolor=#d6d6d6
| 171071 ||  || — || March 9, 2005 || Mount Lemmon || Mount Lemmon Survey || ANF || align=right | 2.5 km || 
|-id=072 bgcolor=#fefefe
| 171072 ||  || — || March 11, 2005 || Kitt Peak || Spacewatch || NYS || align=right data-sort-value="0.93" | 930 m || 
|-id=073 bgcolor=#E9E9E9
| 171073 ||  || — || March 11, 2005 || Mount Lemmon || Mount Lemmon Survey || PAD || align=right | 4.6 km || 
|-id=074 bgcolor=#E9E9E9
| 171074 ||  || — || March 7, 2005 || Socorro || LINEAR || — || align=right | 1.8 km || 
|-id=075 bgcolor=#E9E9E9
| 171075 ||  || — || March 8, 2005 || Mount Lemmon || Mount Lemmon Survey || — || align=right | 1.8 km || 
|-id=076 bgcolor=#fefefe
| 171076 ||  || — || March 9, 2005 || Kitt Peak || Spacewatch || NYS || align=right | 1.0 km || 
|-id=077 bgcolor=#fefefe
| 171077 ||  || — || March 9, 2005 || Kitt Peak || Spacewatch || FLO || align=right data-sort-value="0.83" | 830 m || 
|-id=078 bgcolor=#fefefe
| 171078 ||  || — || March 9, 2005 || Anderson Mesa || LONEOS || — || align=right | 1.2 km || 
|-id=079 bgcolor=#d6d6d6
| 171079 ||  || — || March 9, 2005 || Socorro || LINEAR || KOR || align=right | 2.3 km || 
|-id=080 bgcolor=#E9E9E9
| 171080 ||  || — || March 9, 2005 || Socorro || LINEAR || NEM || align=right | 2.7 km || 
|-id=081 bgcolor=#E9E9E9
| 171081 ||  || — || March 9, 2005 || Siding Spring || SSS || — || align=right | 3.8 km || 
|-id=082 bgcolor=#fefefe
| 171082 ||  || — || March 10, 2005 || Mount Lemmon || Mount Lemmon Survey || NYS || align=right data-sort-value="0.70" | 700 m || 
|-id=083 bgcolor=#E9E9E9
| 171083 ||  || — || March 10, 2005 || Kitt Peak || Spacewatch || — || align=right | 2.5 km || 
|-id=084 bgcolor=#E9E9E9
| 171084 ||  || — || March 11, 2005 || Mount Lemmon || Mount Lemmon Survey || — || align=right | 1.7 km || 
|-id=085 bgcolor=#fefefe
| 171085 ||  || — || March 11, 2005 || Anderson Mesa || LONEOS || FLO || align=right | 1.2 km || 
|-id=086 bgcolor=#E9E9E9
| 171086 ||  || — || March 11, 2005 || Anderson Mesa || LONEOS || — || align=right | 4.1 km || 
|-id=087 bgcolor=#fefefe
| 171087 ||  || — || March 11, 2005 || Kitt Peak || Spacewatch || MAS || align=right | 1.1 km || 
|-id=088 bgcolor=#E9E9E9
| 171088 ||  || — || March 11, 2005 || Kitt Peak || Spacewatch || — || align=right | 1.7 km || 
|-id=089 bgcolor=#E9E9E9
| 171089 ||  || — || March 13, 2005 || Catalina || CSS || — || align=right | 3.5 km || 
|-id=090 bgcolor=#d6d6d6
| 171090 ||  || — || March 12, 2005 || Kitt Peak || Spacewatch || — || align=right | 4.1 km || 
|-id=091 bgcolor=#E9E9E9
| 171091 ||  || — || March 4, 2005 || Catalina || CSS || — || align=right | 3.1 km || 
|-id=092 bgcolor=#E9E9E9
| 171092 ||  || — || March 8, 2005 || Kitt Peak || Spacewatch || — || align=right | 1.4 km || 
|-id=093 bgcolor=#fefefe
| 171093 ||  || — || March 10, 2005 || Siding Spring || SSS || — || align=right | 1.9 km || 
|-id=094 bgcolor=#E9E9E9
| 171094 ||  || — || March 8, 2005 || Socorro || LINEAR || — || align=right | 2.2 km || 
|-id=095 bgcolor=#E9E9E9
| 171095 ||  || — || March 11, 2005 || Kitt Peak || Spacewatch || — || align=right | 1.5 km || 
|-id=096 bgcolor=#E9E9E9
| 171096 ||  || — || March 12, 2005 || Socorro || LINEAR || HNS || align=right | 1.8 km || 
|-id=097 bgcolor=#E9E9E9
| 171097 ||  || — || March 10, 2005 || Catalina || CSS || MAR || align=right | 1.9 km || 
|-id=098 bgcolor=#E9E9E9
| 171098 ||  || — || March 11, 2005 || Catalina || CSS || — || align=right | 3.1 km || 
|-id=099 bgcolor=#fefefe
| 171099 ||  || — || March 10, 2005 || Mount Lemmon || Mount Lemmon Survey || — || align=right | 1.0 km || 
|-id=100 bgcolor=#E9E9E9
| 171100 ||  || — || March 13, 2005 || Kitt Peak || Spacewatch || — || align=right | 1.6 km || 
|}

171101–171200 

|-bgcolor=#E9E9E9
| 171101 ||  || — || March 13, 2005 || Catalina || CSS || — || align=right | 2.7 km || 
|-id=102 bgcolor=#E9E9E9
| 171102 ||  || — || March 14, 2005 || Mount Lemmon || Mount Lemmon Survey || HEN || align=right | 1.9 km || 
|-id=103 bgcolor=#E9E9E9
| 171103 ||  || — || March 15, 2005 || Mount Lemmon || Mount Lemmon Survey || — || align=right | 1.6 km || 
|-id=104 bgcolor=#E9E9E9
| 171104 ||  || — || March 9, 2005 || Catalina || CSS || EUN || align=right | 1.8 km || 
|-id=105 bgcolor=#E9E9E9
| 171105 ||  || — || March 10, 2005 || Catalina || CSS || — || align=right | 1.8 km || 
|-id=106 bgcolor=#E9E9E9
| 171106 ||  || — || March 12, 2005 || Kitt Peak || Spacewatch || — || align=right | 2.6 km || 
|-id=107 bgcolor=#d6d6d6
| 171107 ||  || — || March 3, 2005 || Kitt Peak || Spacewatch || — || align=right | 3.3 km || 
|-id=108 bgcolor=#E9E9E9
| 171108 ||  || — || March 9, 2005 || Catalina || CSS || — || align=right | 2.9 km || 
|-id=109 bgcolor=#E9E9E9
| 171109 ||  || — || March 10, 2005 || Catalina || CSS || — || align=right | 1.7 km || 
|-id=110 bgcolor=#d6d6d6
| 171110 ||  || — || March 10, 2005 || Anderson Mesa || LONEOS || — || align=right | 5.1 km || 
|-id=111 bgcolor=#E9E9E9
| 171111 ||  || — || March 11, 2005 || Kitt Peak || Spacewatch || — || align=right | 4.0 km || 
|-id=112 bgcolor=#d6d6d6
| 171112 Sickafoose ||  ||  || March 11, 2005 || Kitt Peak || A. Gulbis || KOR || align=right | 1.6 km || 
|-id=113 bgcolor=#E9E9E9
| 171113 ||  || — || March 4, 2005 || Kitt Peak || Spacewatch || GEF || align=right | 1.7 km || 
|-id=114 bgcolor=#E9E9E9
| 171114 ||  || — || March 10, 2005 || Mount Lemmon || Mount Lemmon Survey || — || align=right | 1.6 km || 
|-id=115 bgcolor=#d6d6d6
| 171115 ||  || — || March 17, 2005 || Catalina || CSS || Tj (2.99) || align=right | 6.4 km || 
|-id=116 bgcolor=#d6d6d6
| 171116 || 2005 GO || — || April 1, 2005 || Anderson Mesa || LONEOS || EUP || align=right | 4.8 km || 
|-id=117 bgcolor=#E9E9E9
| 171117 ||  || — || April 1, 2005 || Črni Vrh || Črni Vrh || CLO || align=right | 4.1 km || 
|-id=118 bgcolor=#d6d6d6
| 171118 Szigetköz ||  ||  || April 2, 2005 || Piszkéstető || K. Sárneczky || THM || align=right | 3.4 km || 
|-id=119 bgcolor=#E9E9E9
| 171119 ||  || — || April 1, 2005 || Kitt Peak || Spacewatch || HEN || align=right | 4.1 km || 
|-id=120 bgcolor=#d6d6d6
| 171120 ||  || — || April 1, 2005 || Kitt Peak || Spacewatch || EUP || align=right | 4.4 km || 
|-id=121 bgcolor=#E9E9E9
| 171121 ||  || — || April 1, 2005 || Anderson Mesa || LONEOS || — || align=right | 4.4 km || 
|-id=122 bgcolor=#E9E9E9
| 171122 ||  || — || April 2, 2005 || Palomar || NEAT || — || align=right | 4.3 km || 
|-id=123 bgcolor=#E9E9E9
| 171123 ||  || — || April 1, 2005 || Anderson Mesa || LONEOS || — || align=right | 3.6 km || 
|-id=124 bgcolor=#E9E9E9
| 171124 ||  || — || April 1, 2005 || Anderson Mesa || LONEOS || — || align=right | 4.2 km || 
|-id=125 bgcolor=#E9E9E9
| 171125 ||  || — || April 1, 2005 || Anderson Mesa || LONEOS || RAF || align=right | 1.5 km || 
|-id=126 bgcolor=#E9E9E9
| 171126 ||  || — || April 1, 2005 || Anderson Mesa || LONEOS || — || align=right | 2.7 km || 
|-id=127 bgcolor=#d6d6d6
| 171127 ||  || — || April 2, 2005 || Anderson Mesa || LONEOS || — || align=right | 7.1 km || 
|-id=128 bgcolor=#E9E9E9
| 171128 ||  || — || April 3, 2005 || Palomar || NEAT || — || align=right | 2.2 km || 
|-id=129 bgcolor=#E9E9E9
| 171129 ||  || — || April 3, 2005 || Siding Spring || SSS || — || align=right | 3.7 km || 
|-id=130 bgcolor=#fefefe
| 171130 ||  || — || April 4, 2005 || Catalina || CSS || FLO || align=right | 1.3 km || 
|-id=131 bgcolor=#E9E9E9
| 171131 ||  || — || April 1, 2005 || Anderson Mesa || LONEOS || GEF || align=right | 1.9 km || 
|-id=132 bgcolor=#E9E9E9
| 171132 ||  || — || April 2, 2005 || Anderson Mesa || LONEOS || — || align=right | 4.5 km || 
|-id=133 bgcolor=#E9E9E9
| 171133 ||  || — || April 4, 2005 || Kitt Peak || Spacewatch || GEF || align=right | 1.8 km || 
|-id=134 bgcolor=#d6d6d6
| 171134 ||  || — || April 4, 2005 || Socorro || LINEAR || THM || align=right | 3.8 km || 
|-id=135 bgcolor=#d6d6d6
| 171135 ||  || — || April 5, 2005 || Mount Lemmon || Mount Lemmon Survey || THM || align=right | 3.1 km || 
|-id=136 bgcolor=#E9E9E9
| 171136 ||  || — || April 2, 2005 || Mount Lemmon || Mount Lemmon Survey || — || align=right | 2.7 km || 
|-id=137 bgcolor=#d6d6d6
| 171137 ||  || — || April 4, 2005 || Socorro || LINEAR || — || align=right | 4.4 km || 
|-id=138 bgcolor=#E9E9E9
| 171138 ||  || — || April 5, 2005 || Mount Lemmon || Mount Lemmon Survey || GEF || align=right | 1.6 km || 
|-id=139 bgcolor=#d6d6d6
| 171139 ||  || — || April 5, 2005 || Mount Lemmon || Mount Lemmon Survey || THM || align=right | 3.7 km || 
|-id=140 bgcolor=#E9E9E9
| 171140 ||  || — || April 6, 2005 || Kitt Peak || Spacewatch || — || align=right | 3.2 km || 
|-id=141 bgcolor=#d6d6d6
| 171141 ||  || — || April 6, 2005 || Mount Lemmon || Mount Lemmon Survey || — || align=right | 2.9 km || 
|-id=142 bgcolor=#E9E9E9
| 171142 ||  || — || April 4, 2005 || Catalina || CSS || — || align=right | 1.7 km || 
|-id=143 bgcolor=#E9E9E9
| 171143 ||  || — || April 5, 2005 || Catalina || CSS || — || align=right | 2.9 km || 
|-id=144 bgcolor=#d6d6d6
| 171144 ||  || — || April 2, 2005 || Mount Lemmon || Mount Lemmon Survey || — || align=right | 3.8 km || 
|-id=145 bgcolor=#E9E9E9
| 171145 ||  || — || April 2, 2005 || Mount Lemmon || Mount Lemmon Survey || HOF || align=right | 3.9 km || 
|-id=146 bgcolor=#E9E9E9
| 171146 ||  || — || April 2, 2005 || Mount Lemmon || Mount Lemmon Survey || — || align=right | 3.7 km || 
|-id=147 bgcolor=#E9E9E9
| 171147 ||  || — || April 2, 2005 || Catalina || CSS || — || align=right | 3.2 km || 
|-id=148 bgcolor=#d6d6d6
| 171148 ||  || — || April 2, 2005 || Catalina || CSS || EUP || align=right | 6.6 km || 
|-id=149 bgcolor=#fefefe
| 171149 ||  || — || April 4, 2005 || Catalina || CSS || NYS || align=right | 1.0 km || 
|-id=150 bgcolor=#E9E9E9
| 171150 ||  || — || April 4, 2005 || Catalina || CSS || BRU || align=right | 5.0 km || 
|-id=151 bgcolor=#E9E9E9
| 171151 ||  || — || April 5, 2005 || Mount Lemmon || Mount Lemmon Survey || — || align=right | 3.3 km || 
|-id=152 bgcolor=#E9E9E9
| 171152 ||  || — || April 6, 2005 || Catalina || CSS || — || align=right | 3.2 km || 
|-id=153 bgcolor=#d6d6d6
| 171153 Allanrahill ||  ||  || April 10, 2005 || RAS || A. Lowe || EOS || align=right | 3.6 km || 
|-id=154 bgcolor=#E9E9E9
| 171154 ||  || — || April 4, 2005 || Mount Lemmon || Mount Lemmon Survey || — || align=right | 2.0 km || 
|-id=155 bgcolor=#d6d6d6
| 171155 ||  || — || April 5, 2005 || Mount Lemmon || Mount Lemmon Survey || KOR || align=right | 2.0 km || 
|-id=156 bgcolor=#E9E9E9
| 171156 ||  || — || April 5, 2005 || Kitt Peak || Spacewatch || — || align=right | 3.9 km || 
|-id=157 bgcolor=#d6d6d6
| 171157 ||  || — || April 6, 2005 || Kitt Peak || Spacewatch || — || align=right | 4.1 km || 
|-id=158 bgcolor=#d6d6d6
| 171158 ||  || — || April 10, 2005 || Mount Lemmon || Mount Lemmon Survey || — || align=right | 3.6 km || 
|-id=159 bgcolor=#E9E9E9
| 171159 ||  || — || April 6, 2005 || Kitt Peak || Spacewatch || — || align=right | 2.9 km || 
|-id=160 bgcolor=#E9E9E9
| 171160 ||  || — || April 6, 2005 || Kitt Peak || Spacewatch || WIT || align=right | 1.6 km || 
|-id=161 bgcolor=#fefefe
| 171161 ||  || — || April 10, 2005 || Mount Lemmon || Mount Lemmon Survey || MAS || align=right data-sort-value="0.74" | 740 m || 
|-id=162 bgcolor=#d6d6d6
| 171162 ||  || — || April 11, 2005 || Mount Lemmon || Mount Lemmon Survey || THM || align=right | 3.0 km || 
|-id=163 bgcolor=#E9E9E9
| 171163 ||  || — || April 11, 2005 || Anderson Mesa || LONEOS || — || align=right | 2.1 km || 
|-id=164 bgcolor=#fefefe
| 171164 ||  || — || April 6, 2005 || Mount Lemmon || Mount Lemmon Survey || — || align=right | 1.2 km || 
|-id=165 bgcolor=#d6d6d6
| 171165 ||  || — || April 12, 2005 || Anderson Mesa || LONEOS || EOS || align=right | 3.1 km || 
|-id=166 bgcolor=#E9E9E9
| 171166 ||  || — || April 13, 2005 || RAS || A. Lowe || — || align=right | 1.3 km || 
|-id=167 bgcolor=#E9E9E9
| 171167 ||  || — || April 10, 2005 || Kitt Peak || Spacewatch || — || align=right | 3.0 km || 
|-id=168 bgcolor=#E9E9E9
| 171168 ||  || — || April 11, 2005 || Mount Lemmon || Mount Lemmon Survey || — || align=right | 3.0 km || 
|-id=169 bgcolor=#fefefe
| 171169 ||  || — || April 12, 2005 || Anderson Mesa || LONEOS || — || align=right | 2.7 km || 
|-id=170 bgcolor=#E9E9E9
| 171170 ||  || — || April 10, 2005 || Mount Lemmon || Mount Lemmon Survey || — || align=right | 1.8 km || 
|-id=171 bgcolor=#E9E9E9
| 171171 Prior ||  ||  || April 10, 2005 || Mount Lemmon || Mount Lemmon Survey || — || align=right | 2.8 km || 
|-id=172 bgcolor=#E9E9E9
| 171172 ||  || — || April 12, 2005 || Kitt Peak || Spacewatch || — || align=right | 1.4 km || 
|-id=173 bgcolor=#d6d6d6
| 171173 ||  || — || April 12, 2005 || Kitt Peak || Spacewatch || KOR || align=right | 2.0 km || 
|-id=174 bgcolor=#E9E9E9
| 171174 ||  || — || April 12, 2005 || Kitt Peak || Spacewatch || — || align=right | 1.7 km || 
|-id=175 bgcolor=#E9E9E9
| 171175 ||  || — || April 12, 2005 || Mount Lemmon || Mount Lemmon Survey || — || align=right | 2.2 km || 
|-id=176 bgcolor=#d6d6d6
| 171176 ||  || — || April 14, 2005 || Kitt Peak || Spacewatch || KOR || align=right | 2.3 km || 
|-id=177 bgcolor=#d6d6d6
| 171177 ||  || — || April 12, 2005 || Kitt Peak || Spacewatch || EOS || align=right | 3.2 km || 
|-id=178 bgcolor=#E9E9E9
| 171178 ||  || — || April 15, 2005 || Kitt Peak || Spacewatch || — || align=right | 1.7 km || 
|-id=179 bgcolor=#E9E9E9
| 171179 ||  || — || April 3, 2005 || Palomar || NEAT || — || align=right | 1.7 km || 
|-id=180 bgcolor=#E9E9E9
| 171180 || 2005 HK || — || April 16, 2005 || Kitt Peak || Spacewatch || HOF || align=right | 2.9 km || 
|-id=181 bgcolor=#E9E9E9
| 171181 ||  || — || April 16, 2005 || Kitt Peak || Spacewatch || AGN || align=right | 1.6 km || 
|-id=182 bgcolor=#E9E9E9
| 171182 ||  || — || April 16, 2005 || Kitt Peak || Spacewatch || — || align=right | 3.2 km || 
|-id=183 bgcolor=#E9E9E9
| 171183 Haleakala ||  ||  || April 30, 2005 || Haleakala-Faulkes || Faulkes Project || AGN || align=right | 1.7 km || 
|-id=184 bgcolor=#E9E9E9
| 171184 ||  || — || May 3, 2005 || Catalina || CSS || — || align=right | 3.2 km || 
|-id=185 bgcolor=#E9E9E9
| 171185 ||  || — || May 4, 2005 || Mauna Kea || C. Veillet || HEN || align=right | 1.7 km || 
|-id=186 bgcolor=#d6d6d6
| 171186 ||  || — || May 4, 2005 || Mauna Kea || C. Veillet || — || align=right | 3.9 km || 
|-id=187 bgcolor=#d6d6d6
| 171187 ||  || — || May 3, 2005 || Kitt Peak || Spacewatch || — || align=right | 3.0 km || 
|-id=188 bgcolor=#E9E9E9
| 171188 ||  || — || May 4, 2005 || Catalina || CSS || — || align=right | 4.4 km || 
|-id=189 bgcolor=#d6d6d6
| 171189 ||  || — || May 4, 2005 || Siding Spring || SSS || URS || align=right | 5.7 km || 
|-id=190 bgcolor=#fefefe
| 171190 ||  || — || May 1, 2005 || Palomar || NEAT || — || align=right | 1.4 km || 
|-id=191 bgcolor=#d6d6d6
| 171191 ||  || — || May 1, 2005 || Palomar || NEAT || — || align=right | 4.3 km || 
|-id=192 bgcolor=#E9E9E9
| 171192 ||  || — || May 2, 2005 || Kitt Peak || Spacewatch || — || align=right | 3.6 km || 
|-id=193 bgcolor=#d6d6d6
| 171193 ||  || — || May 3, 2005 || Kitt Peak || Spacewatch || — || align=right | 3.5 km || 
|-id=194 bgcolor=#d6d6d6
| 171194 ||  || — || May 3, 2005 || Socorro || LINEAR || SAN || align=right | 2.4 km || 
|-id=195 bgcolor=#E9E9E9
| 171195 ||  || — || May 4, 2005 || Mount Lemmon || Mount Lemmon Survey || DOR || align=right | 4.5 km || 
|-id=196 bgcolor=#E9E9E9
| 171196 ||  || — || May 4, 2005 || Palomar || NEAT || — || align=right | 3.7 km || 
|-id=197 bgcolor=#d6d6d6
| 171197 ||  || — || May 4, 2005 || Mount Lemmon || Mount Lemmon Survey || — || align=right | 3.7 km || 
|-id=198 bgcolor=#d6d6d6
| 171198 ||  || — || May 4, 2005 || Anderson Mesa || LONEOS || — || align=right | 3.8 km || 
|-id=199 bgcolor=#d6d6d6
| 171199 ||  || — || May 3, 2005 || Kitt Peak || Spacewatch || BRA || align=right | 2.8 km || 
|-id=200 bgcolor=#d6d6d6
| 171200 ||  || — || May 3, 2005 || Kitt Peak || Spacewatch || — || align=right | 5.7 km || 
|}

171201–171300 

|-bgcolor=#E9E9E9
| 171201 ||  || — || May 4, 2005 || Palomar || NEAT || — || align=right | 2.9 km || 
|-id=202 bgcolor=#d6d6d6
| 171202 ||  || — || May 4, 2005 || Palomar || NEAT || 7:4 || align=right | 6.2 km || 
|-id=203 bgcolor=#E9E9E9
| 171203 ||  || — || May 7, 2005 || Kitt Peak || Spacewatch || — || align=right | 1.3 km || 
|-id=204 bgcolor=#d6d6d6
| 171204 ||  || — || May 8, 2005 || Kitt Peak || Spacewatch || — || align=right | 4.8 km || 
|-id=205 bgcolor=#d6d6d6
| 171205 ||  || — || May 8, 2005 || Kitt Peak || Spacewatch || — || align=right | 3.4 km || 
|-id=206 bgcolor=#E9E9E9
| 171206 ||  || — || May 9, 2005 || Anderson Mesa || LONEOS || — || align=right | 2.0 km || 
|-id=207 bgcolor=#d6d6d6
| 171207 ||  || — || May 9, 2005 || Catalina || CSS || ALA || align=right | 6.9 km || 
|-id=208 bgcolor=#d6d6d6
| 171208 ||  || — || May 4, 2005 || Palomar || NEAT || — || align=right | 5.9 km || 
|-id=209 bgcolor=#E9E9E9
| 171209 ||  || — || May 4, 2005 || Kitt Peak || Spacewatch || AGN || align=right | 1.7 km || 
|-id=210 bgcolor=#d6d6d6
| 171210 ||  || — || May 6, 2005 || Anderson Mesa || LONEOS || ALA || align=right | 3.6 km || 
|-id=211 bgcolor=#E9E9E9
| 171211 ||  || — || May 7, 2005 || Kitt Peak || Spacewatch || — || align=right | 3.1 km || 
|-id=212 bgcolor=#E9E9E9
| 171212 ||  || — || May 7, 2005 || Kitt Peak || Spacewatch || AEO || align=right | 1.7 km || 
|-id=213 bgcolor=#d6d6d6
| 171213 ||  || — || May 8, 2005 || Kitt Peak || Spacewatch || — || align=right | 4.1 km || 
|-id=214 bgcolor=#d6d6d6
| 171214 ||  || — || May 8, 2005 || Kitt Peak || Spacewatch || EOS || align=right | 2.7 km || 
|-id=215 bgcolor=#E9E9E9
| 171215 ||  || — || May 10, 2005 || Anderson Mesa || LONEOS || GEF || align=right | 2.4 km || 
|-id=216 bgcolor=#E9E9E9
| 171216 ||  || — || May 8, 2005 || Socorro || LINEAR || — || align=right | 2.0 km || 
|-id=217 bgcolor=#d6d6d6
| 171217 ||  || — || May 9, 2005 || Catalina || CSS || — || align=right | 4.9 km || 
|-id=218 bgcolor=#E9E9E9
| 171218 ||  || — || May 11, 2005 || Mount Lemmon || Mount Lemmon Survey || — || align=right | 1.9 km || 
|-id=219 bgcolor=#E9E9E9
| 171219 ||  || — || May 9, 2005 || Anderson Mesa || LONEOS || RAF || align=right | 1.5 km || 
|-id=220 bgcolor=#d6d6d6
| 171220 ||  || — || May 11, 2005 || Mount Lemmon || Mount Lemmon Survey || KOR || align=right | 2.3 km || 
|-id=221 bgcolor=#fefefe
| 171221 ||  || — || May 10, 2005 || Anderson Mesa || LONEOS || — || align=right | 3.4 km || 
|-id=222 bgcolor=#E9E9E9
| 171222 ||  || — || May 11, 2005 || Catalina || CSS || — || align=right | 4.1 km || 
|-id=223 bgcolor=#d6d6d6
| 171223 ||  || — || May 14, 2005 || Kitt Peak || Spacewatch || — || align=right | 4.7 km || 
|-id=224 bgcolor=#d6d6d6
| 171224 ||  || — || May 11, 2005 || Catalina || CSS || EOS || align=right | 3.1 km || 
|-id=225 bgcolor=#d6d6d6
| 171225 ||  || — || May 13, 2005 || Mount Lemmon || Mount Lemmon Survey || — || align=right | 3.3 km || 
|-id=226 bgcolor=#E9E9E9
| 171226 ||  || — || May 15, 2005 || Palomar || NEAT || — || align=right | 2.7 km || 
|-id=227 bgcolor=#E9E9E9
| 171227 ||  || — || May 4, 2005 || Mount Lemmon || Mount Lemmon Survey || HEN || align=right | 1.6 km || 
|-id=228 bgcolor=#fefefe
| 171228 ||  || — || May 4, 2005 || Catalina || CSS || PHO || align=right | 1.6 km || 
|-id=229 bgcolor=#E9E9E9
| 171229 ||  || — || May 4, 2005 || Mount Lemmon || Mount Lemmon Survey || — || align=right | 2.5 km || 
|-id=230 bgcolor=#E9E9E9
| 171230 ||  || — || May 7, 2005 || Mount Lemmon || Mount Lemmon Survey || AGN || align=right | 1.7 km || 
|-id=231 bgcolor=#E9E9E9
| 171231 ||  || — || May 7, 2005 || Mount Lemmon || Mount Lemmon Survey || — || align=right | 2.8 km || 
|-id=232 bgcolor=#d6d6d6
| 171232 ||  || — || May 7, 2005 || Mount Lemmon || Mount Lemmon Survey || — || align=right | 2.8 km || 
|-id=233 bgcolor=#d6d6d6
| 171233 ||  || — || May 9, 2005 || Kitt Peak || Spacewatch || — || align=right | 3.7 km || 
|-id=234 bgcolor=#d6d6d6
| 171234 ||  || — || May 10, 2005 || Kitt Peak || Spacewatch || NAE || align=right | 4.7 km || 
|-id=235 bgcolor=#d6d6d6
| 171235 ||  || — || May 11, 2005 || Mount Lemmon || Mount Lemmon Survey || KOR || align=right | 1.9 km || 
|-id=236 bgcolor=#d6d6d6
| 171236 ||  || — || May 8, 2005 || Kitt Peak || Spacewatch || — || align=right | 4.0 km || 
|-id=237 bgcolor=#d6d6d6
| 171237 ||  || — || May 9, 2005 || Anderson Mesa || LONEOS || HYG || align=right | 3.9 km || 
|-id=238 bgcolor=#d6d6d6
| 171238 ||  || — || May 19, 2005 || Mount Lemmon || Mount Lemmon Survey || TIR || align=right | 3.0 km || 
|-id=239 bgcolor=#d6d6d6
| 171239 ||  || — || May 29, 2005 || Siding Spring || SSS || — || align=right | 3.9 km || 
|-id=240 bgcolor=#E9E9E9
| 171240 ||  || — || May 31, 2005 || Reedy Creek || J. Broughton || — || align=right | 3.3 km || 
|-id=241 bgcolor=#d6d6d6
| 171241 ||  || — || May 30, 2005 || Junk Bond || Junk Bond Obs. || — || align=right | 6.8 km || 
|-id=242 bgcolor=#d6d6d6
| 171242 ||  || — || June 2, 2005 || Catalina || CSS || — || align=right | 5.8 km || 
|-id=243 bgcolor=#E9E9E9
| 171243 ||  || — || June 5, 2005 || Reedy Creek || J. Broughton || HNS || align=right | 3.2 km || 
|-id=244 bgcolor=#d6d6d6
| 171244 ||  || — || June 1, 2005 || Kitt Peak || Spacewatch || THM || align=right | 4.5 km || 
|-id=245 bgcolor=#d6d6d6
| 171245 ||  || — || June 1, 2005 || Kitt Peak || Spacewatch || — || align=right | 3.8 km || 
|-id=246 bgcolor=#E9E9E9
| 171246 ||  || — || June 13, 2005 || Mount Lemmon || Mount Lemmon Survey || — || align=right | 2.1 km || 
|-id=247 bgcolor=#d6d6d6
| 171247 ||  || — || June 11, 2005 || Kitt Peak || Spacewatch || — || align=right | 5.1 km || 
|-id=248 bgcolor=#d6d6d6
| 171248 ||  || — || June 10, 2005 || Kitt Peak || Spacewatch || — || align=right | 3.9 km || 
|-id=249 bgcolor=#E9E9E9
| 171249 ||  || — || June 19, 2005 || Socorro || LINEAR || — || align=right | 4.5 km || 
|-id=250 bgcolor=#d6d6d6
| 171250 ||  || — || June 29, 2005 || Palomar || NEAT || EOS || align=right | 3.4 km || 
|-id=251 bgcolor=#d6d6d6
| 171251 ||  || — || June 30, 2005 || Kitt Peak || Spacewatch || EOS || align=right | 3.2 km || 
|-id=252 bgcolor=#d6d6d6
| 171252 ||  || — || June 29, 2005 || Palomar || NEAT || — || align=right | 4.8 km || 
|-id=253 bgcolor=#C2FFFF
| 171253 ||  || — || July 4, 2005 || Mount Lemmon || Mount Lemmon Survey || L4 || align=right | 11 km || 
|-id=254 bgcolor=#E9E9E9
| 171254 ||  || — || July 5, 2005 || Palomar || NEAT || GER || align=right | 3.4 km || 
|-id=255 bgcolor=#E9E9E9
| 171255 ||  || — || July 4, 2005 || Mount Lemmon || Mount Lemmon Survey || MAR || align=right | 4.8 km || 
|-id=256 bgcolor=#d6d6d6
| 171256 Lucieconstant ||  ||  || August 8, 2005 || Saint-Sulpice || B. Christophe || — || align=right | 4.0 km || 
|-id=257 bgcolor=#d6d6d6
| 171257 ||  || — || August 25, 2005 || Palomar || NEAT || THM || align=right | 4.4 km || 
|-id=258 bgcolor=#d6d6d6
| 171258 ||  || — || August 30, 2005 || Socorro || LINEAR || 3:2 || align=right | 7.5 km || 
|-id=259 bgcolor=#E9E9E9
| 171259 ||  || — || January 23, 2006 || Mount Lemmon || Mount Lemmon Survey || — || align=right | 1.5 km || 
|-id=260 bgcolor=#fefefe
| 171260 ||  || — || January 26, 2006 || Kitt Peak || Spacewatch || — || align=right | 1.1 km || 
|-id=261 bgcolor=#fefefe
| 171261 ||  || — || February 20, 2006 || Kitt Peak || Spacewatch || — || align=right | 1.1 km || 
|-id=262 bgcolor=#fefefe
| 171262 ||  || — || February 24, 2006 || Kitt Peak || Spacewatch || FLO || align=right data-sort-value="0.89" | 890 m || 
|-id=263 bgcolor=#fefefe
| 171263 ||  || — || February 24, 2006 || Kitt Peak || Spacewatch || V || align=right data-sort-value="0.97" | 970 m || 
|-id=264 bgcolor=#fefefe
| 171264 ||  || — || February 24, 2006 || Mount Lemmon || Mount Lemmon Survey || FLO || align=right data-sort-value="0.81" | 810 m || 
|-id=265 bgcolor=#fefefe
| 171265 ||  || — || February 25, 2006 || Kitt Peak || Spacewatch || — || align=right data-sort-value="0.90" | 900 m || 
|-id=266 bgcolor=#fefefe
| 171266 ||  || — || February 27, 2006 || Kitt Peak || Spacewatch || — || align=right | 1.0 km || 
|-id=267 bgcolor=#fefefe
| 171267 ||  || — || February 25, 2006 || Kitt Peak || Spacewatch || — || align=right | 1.2 km || 
|-id=268 bgcolor=#fefefe
| 171268 ||  || — || February 27, 2006 || Mount Lemmon || Mount Lemmon Survey || — || align=right | 1.1 km || 
|-id=269 bgcolor=#fefefe
| 171269 ||  || — || February 27, 2006 || Mount Lemmon || Mount Lemmon Survey || NYS || align=right data-sort-value="0.88" | 880 m || 
|-id=270 bgcolor=#fefefe
| 171270 ||  || — || February 27, 2006 || Kitt Peak || Spacewatch || — || align=right | 1.1 km || 
|-id=271 bgcolor=#fefefe
| 171271 ||  || — || March 2, 2006 || Kitt Peak || Spacewatch || NYS || align=right data-sort-value="0.97" | 970 m || 
|-id=272 bgcolor=#fefefe
| 171272 ||  || — || March 4, 2006 || Kitt Peak || Spacewatch || — || align=right data-sort-value="0.91" | 910 m || 
|-id=273 bgcolor=#fefefe
| 171273 || 2006 FR || — || March 22, 2006 || Catalina || CSS || — || align=right | 1.6 km || 
|-id=274 bgcolor=#fefefe
| 171274 ||  || — || March 23, 2006 || Kitt Peak || Spacewatch || — || align=right | 1.6 km || 
|-id=275 bgcolor=#fefefe
| 171275 ||  || — || March 23, 2006 || Kitt Peak || Spacewatch || FLO || align=right data-sort-value="0.93" | 930 m || 
|-id=276 bgcolor=#fefefe
| 171276 ||  || — || March 23, 2006 || Kitt Peak || Spacewatch || — || align=right | 1.9 km || 
|-id=277 bgcolor=#fefefe
| 171277 ||  || — || March 24, 2006 || Kitt Peak || Spacewatch || — || align=right | 1.3 km || 
|-id=278 bgcolor=#fefefe
| 171278 ||  || — || March 24, 2006 || Mount Lemmon || Mount Lemmon Survey || — || align=right | 2.7 km || 
|-id=279 bgcolor=#fefefe
| 171279 ||  || — || March 24, 2006 || Mount Lemmon || Mount Lemmon Survey || — || align=right | 1.0 km || 
|-id=280 bgcolor=#fefefe
| 171280 ||  || — || March 24, 2006 || Kitt Peak || Spacewatch || H || align=right data-sort-value="0.92" | 920 m || 
|-id=281 bgcolor=#fefefe
| 171281 ||  || — || March 24, 2006 || Socorro || LINEAR || — || align=right | 1.4 km || 
|-id=282 bgcolor=#fefefe
| 171282 ||  || — || March 26, 2006 || Mount Lemmon || Mount Lemmon Survey || — || align=right | 1.2 km || 
|-id=283 bgcolor=#fefefe
| 171283 ||  || — || March 23, 2006 || Catalina || CSS || — || align=right | 1.5 km || 
|-id=284 bgcolor=#fefefe
| 171284 ||  || — || March 24, 2006 || Anderson Mesa || LONEOS || — || align=right | 1.4 km || 
|-id=285 bgcolor=#fefefe
| 171285 ||  || — || March 25, 2006 || Anderson Mesa || LONEOS || H || align=right data-sort-value="0.97" | 970 m || 
|-id=286 bgcolor=#E9E9E9
| 171286 ||  || — || March 30, 2006 || Socorro || LINEAR || — || align=right | 2.7 km || 
|-id=287 bgcolor=#fefefe
| 171287 ||  || — || April 7, 2006 || Wrightwood || J. W. Young || — || align=right | 1.2 km || 
|-id=288 bgcolor=#fefefe
| 171288 ||  || — || April 2, 2006 || Kitt Peak || Spacewatch || — || align=right | 1.3 km || 
|-id=289 bgcolor=#fefefe
| 171289 ||  || — || April 2, 2006 || Kitt Peak || Spacewatch || V || align=right data-sort-value="0.63" | 630 m || 
|-id=290 bgcolor=#fefefe
| 171290 ||  || — || April 6, 2006 || Catalina || CSS || NYS || align=right data-sort-value="0.82" | 820 m || 
|-id=291 bgcolor=#fefefe
| 171291 ||  || — || April 7, 2006 || Socorro || LINEAR || — || align=right | 1.5 km || 
|-id=292 bgcolor=#fefefe
| 171292 ||  || — || April 6, 2006 || Catalina || CSS || — || align=right | 1.2 km || 
|-id=293 bgcolor=#fefefe
| 171293 ||  || — || April 6, 2006 || Siding Spring || SSS || — || align=right | 1.6 km || 
|-id=294 bgcolor=#fefefe
| 171294 ||  || — || April 7, 2006 || Catalina || CSS || NYS || align=right | 1.0 km || 
|-id=295 bgcolor=#d6d6d6
| 171295 ||  || — || April 18, 2006 || Anderson Mesa || LONEOS || — || align=right | 5.0 km || 
|-id=296 bgcolor=#fefefe
| 171296 ||  || — || April 18, 2006 || Catalina || CSS || FLO || align=right data-sort-value="0.99" | 990 m || 
|-id=297 bgcolor=#E9E9E9
| 171297 ||  || — || April 18, 2006 || Kitt Peak || Spacewatch || — || align=right | 3.3 km || 
|-id=298 bgcolor=#fefefe
| 171298 ||  || — || April 18, 2006 || Kitt Peak || Spacewatch || V || align=right | 1.0 km || 
|-id=299 bgcolor=#fefefe
| 171299 ||  || — || April 18, 2006 || Anderson Mesa || LONEOS || — || align=right | 1.4 km || 
|-id=300 bgcolor=#fefefe
| 171300 ||  || — || April 20, 2006 || RAS || A. Lowe || H || align=right data-sort-value="0.97" | 970 m || 
|}

171301–171400 

|-bgcolor=#fefefe
| 171301 ||  || — || April 19, 2006 || Kitt Peak || Spacewatch || FLO || align=right | 1.1 km || 
|-id=302 bgcolor=#fefefe
| 171302 ||  || — || April 20, 2006 || Kitt Peak || Spacewatch || — || align=right | 2.8 km || 
|-id=303 bgcolor=#fefefe
| 171303 ||  || — || April 21, 2006 || Mount Lemmon || Mount Lemmon Survey || NYS || align=right data-sort-value="0.96" | 960 m || 
|-id=304 bgcolor=#E9E9E9
| 171304 ||  || — || April 19, 2006 || Catalina || CSS || JUN || align=right | 1.9 km || 
|-id=305 bgcolor=#E9E9E9
| 171305 ||  || — || April 19, 2006 || Catalina || CSS || — || align=right | 2.0 km || 
|-id=306 bgcolor=#fefefe
| 171306 ||  || — || April 19, 2006 || Catalina || CSS || — || align=right | 1.2 km || 
|-id=307 bgcolor=#E9E9E9
| 171307 ||  || — || April 19, 2006 || Mount Lemmon || Mount Lemmon Survey || — || align=right | 1.9 km || 
|-id=308 bgcolor=#E9E9E9
| 171308 ||  || — || April 21, 2006 || Kitt Peak || Spacewatch || — || align=right | 2.9 km || 
|-id=309 bgcolor=#fefefe
| 171309 ||  || — || April 21, 2006 || Siding Spring || SSS || FLO || align=right | 1.2 km || 
|-id=310 bgcolor=#fefefe
| 171310 ||  || — || April 24, 2006 || Socorro || LINEAR || — || align=right | 1.8 km || 
|-id=311 bgcolor=#fefefe
| 171311 ||  || — || April 24, 2006 || Mount Lemmon || Mount Lemmon Survey || — || align=right data-sort-value="0.79" | 790 m || 
|-id=312 bgcolor=#fefefe
| 171312 ||  || — || April 20, 2006 || Kitt Peak || Spacewatch || V || align=right data-sort-value="0.98" | 980 m || 
|-id=313 bgcolor=#fefefe
| 171313 ||  || — || April 24, 2006 || Kitt Peak || Spacewatch || FLO || align=right | 1.2 km || 
|-id=314 bgcolor=#fefefe
| 171314 ||  || — || April 24, 2006 || Reedy Creek || J. Broughton || FLO || align=right | 1.7 km || 
|-id=315 bgcolor=#fefefe
| 171315 ||  || — || April 27, 2006 || RAS || A. Lowe || — || align=right | 1.2 km || 
|-id=316 bgcolor=#fefefe
| 171316 ||  || — || April 20, 2006 || Catalina || CSS || NYS || align=right data-sort-value="0.99" | 990 m || 
|-id=317 bgcolor=#fefefe
| 171317 ||  || — || April 24, 2006 || Kitt Peak || Spacewatch || — || align=right data-sort-value="0.86" | 860 m || 
|-id=318 bgcolor=#fefefe
| 171318 ||  || — || April 24, 2006 || Mount Lemmon || Mount Lemmon Survey || NYS || align=right | 1.7 km || 
|-id=319 bgcolor=#fefefe
| 171319 ||  || — || April 25, 2006 || Kitt Peak || Spacewatch || — || align=right | 1.2 km || 
|-id=320 bgcolor=#fefefe
| 171320 ||  || — || April 26, 2006 || Mount Lemmon || Mount Lemmon Survey || — || align=right | 1.0 km || 
|-id=321 bgcolor=#fefefe
| 171321 ||  || — || April 26, 2006 || Kitt Peak || Spacewatch || MAS || align=right data-sort-value="0.84" | 840 m || 
|-id=322 bgcolor=#fefefe
| 171322 ||  || — || April 29, 2006 || Kitt Peak || Spacewatch || V || align=right | 1.1 km || 
|-id=323 bgcolor=#E9E9E9
| 171323 ||  || — || April 29, 2006 || Kitt Peak || Spacewatch || HOF || align=right | 3.4 km || 
|-id=324 bgcolor=#fefefe
| 171324 ||  || — || April 30, 2006 || Kitt Peak || Spacewatch || — || align=right | 1.1 km || 
|-id=325 bgcolor=#E9E9E9
| 171325 ||  || — || April 30, 2006 || Kitt Peak || Spacewatch || — || align=right | 2.1 km || 
|-id=326 bgcolor=#fefefe
| 171326 ||  || — || May 3, 2006 || Reedy Creek || J. Broughton || — || align=right | 1.8 km || 
|-id=327 bgcolor=#fefefe
| 171327 ||  || — || May 1, 2006 || Kitt Peak || Spacewatch || — || align=right data-sort-value="0.95" | 950 m || 
|-id=328 bgcolor=#E9E9E9
| 171328 ||  || — || May 2, 2006 || Mount Lemmon || Mount Lemmon Survey || — || align=right | 1.6 km || 
|-id=329 bgcolor=#E9E9E9
| 171329 ||  || — || May 1, 2006 || Socorro || LINEAR || — || align=right | 2.1 km || 
|-id=330 bgcolor=#E9E9E9
| 171330 ||  || — || May 5, 2006 || Kitt Peak || Spacewatch || RAF || align=right | 1.9 km || 
|-id=331 bgcolor=#fefefe
| 171331 ||  || — || May 6, 2006 || Mount Lemmon || Mount Lemmon Survey || V || align=right | 1.2 km || 
|-id=332 bgcolor=#d6d6d6
| 171332 ||  || — || May 8, 2006 || Mount Lemmon || Mount Lemmon Survey || — || align=right | 3.7 km || 
|-id=333 bgcolor=#E9E9E9
| 171333 ||  || — || May 10, 2006 || Mount Lemmon || Mount Lemmon Survey || — || align=right | 1.7 km || 
|-id=334 bgcolor=#E9E9E9
| 171334 ||  || — || May 9, 2006 || Kitt Peak || Spacewatch || — || align=right | 1.4 km || 
|-id=335 bgcolor=#fefefe
| 171335 ||  || — || May 5, 2006 || Kitt Peak || Spacewatch || V || align=right | 1.0 km || 
|-id=336 bgcolor=#fefefe
| 171336 ||  || — || May 8, 2006 || Mount Lemmon || Mount Lemmon Survey || — || align=right | 1.1 km || 
|-id=337 bgcolor=#fefefe
| 171337 ||  || — || May 1, 2006 || Kitt Peak || M. W. Buie || MAS || align=right data-sort-value="0.88" | 880 m || 
|-id=338 bgcolor=#fefefe
| 171338 ||  || — || May 2, 2006 || Kitt Peak || M. W. Buie || MAS || align=right | 1.2 km || 
|-id=339 bgcolor=#fefefe
| 171339 ||  || — || May 18, 2006 || Palomar || NEAT || NYS || align=right data-sort-value="0.93" | 930 m || 
|-id=340 bgcolor=#E9E9E9
| 171340 ||  || — || May 19, 2006 || Catalina || CSS || — || align=right | 1.8 km || 
|-id=341 bgcolor=#E9E9E9
| 171341 ||  || — || May 19, 2006 || Mount Lemmon || Mount Lemmon Survey || — || align=right | 1.5 km || 
|-id=342 bgcolor=#E9E9E9
| 171342 ||  || — || May 19, 2006 || Catalina || CSS || — || align=right | 2.4 km || 
|-id=343 bgcolor=#E9E9E9
| 171343 ||  || — || May 19, 2006 || Mount Lemmon || Mount Lemmon Survey || — || align=right | 3.3 km || 
|-id=344 bgcolor=#E9E9E9
| 171344 ||  || — || May 20, 2006 || Catalina || CSS || EUN || align=right | 1.7 km || 
|-id=345 bgcolor=#fefefe
| 171345 ||  || — || May 21, 2006 || Siding Spring || SSS || — || align=right | 1.5 km || 
|-id=346 bgcolor=#fefefe
| 171346 ||  || — || May 16, 2006 || Siding Spring || SSS || — || align=right | 1.1 km || 
|-id=347 bgcolor=#fefefe
| 171347 ||  || — || May 18, 2006 || Siding Spring || SSS || — || align=right | 1.2 km || 
|-id=348 bgcolor=#fefefe
| 171348 ||  || — || May 20, 2006 || Kitt Peak || Spacewatch || — || align=right | 1.1 km || 
|-id=349 bgcolor=#E9E9E9
| 171349 ||  || — || May 20, 2006 || Kitt Peak || Spacewatch || — || align=right | 1.3 km || 
|-id=350 bgcolor=#E9E9E9
| 171350 ||  || — || May 21, 2006 || Mount Lemmon || Mount Lemmon Survey || XIZ || align=right | 2.2 km || 
|-id=351 bgcolor=#d6d6d6
| 171351 ||  || — || May 22, 2006 || Kitt Peak || Spacewatch || — || align=right | 5.4 km || 
|-id=352 bgcolor=#d6d6d6
| 171352 ||  || — || May 23, 2006 || Mount Lemmon || Mount Lemmon Survey || — || align=right | 3.1 km || 
|-id=353 bgcolor=#fefefe
| 171353 ||  || — || May 24, 2006 || Kitt Peak || Spacewatch || V || align=right data-sort-value="0.87" | 870 m || 
|-id=354 bgcolor=#E9E9E9
| 171354 ||  || — || May 24, 2006 || Kitt Peak || Spacewatch || — || align=right | 2.7 km || 
|-id=355 bgcolor=#E9E9E9
| 171355 ||  || — || May 20, 2006 || Catalina || CSS || — || align=right | 1.7 km || 
|-id=356 bgcolor=#d6d6d6
| 171356 ||  || — || May 23, 2006 || Kitt Peak || Spacewatch || — || align=right | 2.9 km || 
|-id=357 bgcolor=#E9E9E9
| 171357 ||  || — || May 19, 2006 || Palomar || NEAT || — || align=right | 1.8 km || 
|-id=358 bgcolor=#E9E9E9
| 171358 ||  || — || May 20, 2006 || Siding Spring || SSS || — || align=right | 2.8 km || 
|-id=359 bgcolor=#E9E9E9
| 171359 ||  || — || May 28, 2006 || Kitt Peak || Spacewatch || AGN || align=right | 1.5 km || 
|-id=360 bgcolor=#fefefe
| 171360 ||  || — || May 31, 2006 || Mount Lemmon || Mount Lemmon Survey || NYS || align=right | 1.0 km || 
|-id=361 bgcolor=#E9E9E9
| 171361 ||  || — || May 31, 2006 || Mount Lemmon || Mount Lemmon Survey || — || align=right | 1.4 km || 
|-id=362 bgcolor=#fefefe
| 171362 ||  || — || May 31, 2006 || Mount Lemmon || Mount Lemmon Survey || NYS || align=right | 1.7 km || 
|-id=363 bgcolor=#E9E9E9
| 171363 ||  || — || May 28, 2006 || Siding Spring || SSS || EUN || align=right | 2.2 km || 
|-id=364 bgcolor=#d6d6d6
| 171364 ||  || — || June 1, 2006 || Kitt Peak || Spacewatch || — || align=right | 4.8 km || 
|-id=365 bgcolor=#fefefe
| 171365 ||  || — || June 5, 2006 || Socorro || LINEAR || NYS || align=right | 2.2 km || 
|-id=366 bgcolor=#E9E9E9
| 171366 ||  || — || June 7, 2006 || Siding Spring || SSS || — || align=right | 2.5 km || 
|-id=367 bgcolor=#fefefe
| 171367 ||  || — || June 15, 2006 || Kitt Peak || Spacewatch || V || align=right | 1.1 km || 
|-id=368 bgcolor=#E9E9E9
| 171368 ||  || — || June 7, 2006 || Siding Spring || SSS || — || align=right | 4.7 km || 
|-id=369 bgcolor=#d6d6d6
| 171369 ||  || — || June 4, 2006 || Mount Lemmon || Mount Lemmon Survey || — || align=right | 4.5 km || 
|-id=370 bgcolor=#E9E9E9
| 171370 ||  || — || June 3, 2006 || Mount Lemmon || Mount Lemmon Survey || — || align=right | 4.6 km || 
|-id=371 bgcolor=#d6d6d6
| 171371 ||  || — || June 10, 2006 || Palomar || NEAT || — || align=right | 5.7 km || 
|-id=372 bgcolor=#d6d6d6
| 171372 ||  || — || June 19, 2006 || Mount Lemmon || Mount Lemmon Survey || HYG || align=right | 4.9 km || 
|-id=373 bgcolor=#fefefe
| 171373 ||  || — || June 28, 2006 || Siding Spring || SSS || PHO || align=right | 2.6 km || 
|-id=374 bgcolor=#E9E9E9
| 171374 || 2006 NE || — || July 1, 2006 || Reedy Creek || J. Broughton || — || align=right | 4.7 km || 
|-id=375 bgcolor=#d6d6d6
| 171375 || 2006 OH || — || July 17, 2006 || Eskridge || Farpoint Obs. || EOS || align=right | 2.8 km || 
|-id=376 bgcolor=#d6d6d6
| 171376 || 2006 OM || — || July 17, 2006 || Vicques || M. Ory || — || align=right | 3.4 km || 
|-id=377 bgcolor=#d6d6d6
| 171377 ||  || — || July 20, 2006 || Palomar || NEAT || VER || align=right | 4.3 km || 
|-id=378 bgcolor=#fefefe
| 171378 ||  || — || July 20, 2006 || Palomar || NEAT || MAS || align=right | 1.6 km || 
|-id=379 bgcolor=#d6d6d6
| 171379 ||  || — || July 24, 2006 || Hibiscus || S. F. Hönig || — || align=right | 4.1 km || 
|-id=380 bgcolor=#E9E9E9
| 171380 ||  || — || July 18, 2006 || Siding Spring || SSS || — || align=right | 2.8 km || 
|-id=381 bgcolor=#d6d6d6
| 171381 Taipei ||  ||  || July 22, 2006 || Lulin Observatory || H.-C. Lin, Q.-z. Ye || EOS || align=right | 2.7 km || 
|-id=382 bgcolor=#E9E9E9
| 171382 ||  || — || July 18, 2006 || Siding Spring || SSS || — || align=right | 3.6 km || 
|-id=383 bgcolor=#d6d6d6
| 171383 ||  || — || July 18, 2006 || Siding Spring || SSS || — || align=right | 4.4 km || 
|-id=384 bgcolor=#d6d6d6
| 171384 ||  || — || August 12, 2006 || Palomar || NEAT || — || align=right | 3.6 km || 
|-id=385 bgcolor=#fefefe
| 171385 ||  || — || August 12, 2006 || Palomar || NEAT || V || align=right | 1.2 km || 
|-id=386 bgcolor=#d6d6d6
| 171386 ||  || — || August 13, 2006 || Palomar || NEAT || — || align=right | 4.5 km || 
|-id=387 bgcolor=#fefefe
| 171387 ||  || — || August 13, 2006 || Palomar || NEAT || MAS || align=right | 1.2 km || 
|-id=388 bgcolor=#E9E9E9
| 171388 ||  || — || August 13, 2006 || Palomar || NEAT || NEM || align=right | 3.5 km || 
|-id=389 bgcolor=#d6d6d6
| 171389 ||  || — || August 13, 2006 || Palomar || NEAT || — || align=right | 4.0 km || 
|-id=390 bgcolor=#d6d6d6
| 171390 ||  || — || August 14, 2006 || Siding Spring || SSS || — || align=right | 7.1 km || 
|-id=391 bgcolor=#d6d6d6
| 171391 ||  || — || August 13, 2006 || Siding Spring || SSS || EUP || align=right | 5.5 km || 
|-id=392 bgcolor=#fefefe
| 171392 ||  || — || August 12, 2006 || Palomar || NEAT || — || align=right | 1.7 km || 
|-id=393 bgcolor=#d6d6d6
| 171393 ||  || — || August 15, 2006 || Palomar || NEAT || — || align=right | 5.8 km || 
|-id=394 bgcolor=#d6d6d6
| 171394 ||  || — || August 14, 2006 || Palomar || NEAT || — || align=right | 4.1 km || 
|-id=395 bgcolor=#fefefe
| 171395 ||  || — || August 20, 2006 || Kitt Peak || Spacewatch || FLO || align=right | 1.0 km || 
|-id=396 bgcolor=#fefefe
| 171396 Miguel ||  ||  || August 24, 2006 || La Cañada || J. Lacruz || — || align=right | 1.3 km || 
|-id=397 bgcolor=#d6d6d6
| 171397 ||  || — || August 16, 2006 || Siding Spring || SSS || EOS || align=right | 3.5 km || 
|-id=398 bgcolor=#d6d6d6
| 171398 ||  || — || August 17, 2006 || Palomar || NEAT || 7:4 || align=right | 5.3 km || 
|-id=399 bgcolor=#d6d6d6
| 171399 ||  || — || August 21, 2006 || Socorro || LINEAR || — || align=right | 3.8 km || 
|-id=400 bgcolor=#fefefe
| 171400 ||  || — || August 22, 2006 || Palomar || NEAT || V || align=right | 1.6 km || 
|}

171401–171500 

|-bgcolor=#d6d6d6
| 171401 ||  || — || August 17, 2006 || Palomar || NEAT || URS || align=right | 6.8 km || 
|-id=402 bgcolor=#E9E9E9
| 171402 ||  || — || August 23, 2006 || Siding Spring || SSS || BRU || align=right | 5.3 km || 
|-id=403 bgcolor=#E9E9E9
| 171403 ||  || — || August 16, 2006 || Palomar || NEAT || HOF || align=right | 4.7 km || 
|-id=404 bgcolor=#E9E9E9
| 171404 ||  || — || August 18, 2006 || Palomar || NEAT || HOF || align=right | 4.1 km || 
|-id=405 bgcolor=#E9E9E9
| 171405 ||  || — || August 28, 2006 || Socorro || LINEAR || — || align=right | 3.3 km || 
|-id=406 bgcolor=#E9E9E9
| 171406 ||  || — || August 18, 2006 || Kitt Peak || Spacewatch || — || align=right | 2.8 km || 
|-id=407 bgcolor=#d6d6d6
| 171407 ||  || — || August 18, 2006 || Kitt Peak || Spacewatch || KOR || align=right | 2.2 km || 
|-id=408 bgcolor=#E9E9E9
| 171408 ||  || — || August 19, 2006 || Kitt Peak || Spacewatch || — || align=right | 2.5 km || 
|-id=409 bgcolor=#fefefe
| 171409 ||  || — || August 21, 2006 || Kitt Peak || Spacewatch || V || align=right | 1.1 km || 
|-id=410 bgcolor=#d6d6d6
| 171410 ||  || — || August 30, 2006 || Anderson Mesa || LONEOS || — || align=right | 4.6 km || 
|-id=411 bgcolor=#d6d6d6
| 171411 ||  || — || September 11, 2006 || Catalina || CSS || TIR || align=right | 5.0 km || 
|-id=412 bgcolor=#E9E9E9
| 171412 ||  || — || September 14, 2006 || Palomar || NEAT || — || align=right | 2.5 km || 
|-id=413 bgcolor=#E9E9E9
| 171413 ||  || — || September 14, 2006 || Kitt Peak || Spacewatch || — || align=right | 4.1 km || 
|-id=414 bgcolor=#d6d6d6
| 171414 ||  || — || September 15, 2006 || Kitt Peak || Spacewatch || 7:4 || align=right | 3.7 km || 
|-id=415 bgcolor=#E9E9E9
| 171415 ||  || — || September 14, 2006 || Palomar || NEAT || — || align=right | 2.1 km || 
|-id=416 bgcolor=#d6d6d6
| 171416 ||  || — || September 16, 2006 || Socorro || LINEAR || — || align=right | 4.6 km || 
|-id=417 bgcolor=#d6d6d6
| 171417 ||  || — || September 20, 2006 || Catalina || CSS || VER || align=right | 3.9 km || 
|-id=418 bgcolor=#d6d6d6
| 171418 ||  || — || October 2, 2006 || Mount Lemmon || Mount Lemmon Survey || — || align=right | 4.6 km || 
|-id=419 bgcolor=#fefefe
| 171419 ||  || — || October 18, 2006 || Kitt Peak || Spacewatch || FLO || align=right | 1.0 km || 
|-id=420 bgcolor=#d6d6d6
| 171420 ||  || — || November 10, 2006 || Kitt Peak || Spacewatch || 3:2 || align=right | 13 km || 
|-id=421 bgcolor=#d6d6d6
| 171421 ||  || — || January 14, 2007 || Altschwendt || W. Ries || EOS || align=right | 3.2 km || 
|-id=422 bgcolor=#E9E9E9
| 171422 ||  || — || March 9, 2007 || Kitt Peak || Spacewatch || — || align=right | 1.3 km || 
|-id=423 bgcolor=#fefefe
| 171423 ||  || — || June 21, 2007 || Mount Lemmon || Mount Lemmon Survey || — || align=right | 1.6 km || 
|-id=424 bgcolor=#C2FFFF
| 171424 ||  || — || July 13, 2007 || OAM || OAM Obs. || L4 || align=right | 20 km || 
|-id=425 bgcolor=#fefefe
| 171425 ||  || — || August 8, 2007 || Socorro || LINEAR || NYS || align=right | 1.2 km || 
|-id=426 bgcolor=#d6d6d6
| 171426 ||  || — || August 9, 2007 || Socorro || LINEAR || — || align=right | 4.3 km || 
|-id=427 bgcolor=#E9E9E9
| 171427 ||  || — || August 9, 2007 || Socorro || LINEAR || — || align=right | 2.9 km || 
|-id=428 bgcolor=#fefefe
| 171428 ||  || — || August 9, 2007 || Socorro || LINEAR || NYS || align=right | 1.0 km || 
|-id=429 bgcolor=#d6d6d6
| 171429 Hunstead ||  ||  || September 1, 2007 || Siding Spring || K. Sárneczky, L. Kiss || URS || align=right | 5.6 km || 
|-id=430 bgcolor=#fefefe
| 171430 ||  || — || September 9, 2007 || Palomar || Palomar Obs. || MAS || align=right | 1.0 km || 
|-id=431 bgcolor=#E9E9E9
| 171431 ||  || — || September 13, 2007 || Chante-Perdrix || Chante-Perdrix Obs. || — || align=right | 3.8 km || 
|-id=432 bgcolor=#E9E9E9
| 171432 ||  || — || September 5, 2007 || Bergisch Gladbach || W. Bickel || — || align=right | 1.3 km || 
|-id=433 bgcolor=#C2FFFF
| 171433 Prothous ||  ||  || September 7, 2007 || La Cañada || J. Lacruz || L4 || align=right | 13 km || 
|-id=434 bgcolor=#fefefe
| 171434 ||  || — || September 8, 2007 || Anderson Mesa || LONEOS || NYS || align=right | 1.1 km || 
|-id=435 bgcolor=#E9E9E9
| 171435 ||  || — || September 10, 2007 || Kitt Peak || Spacewatch || — || align=right | 2.5 km || 
|-id=436 bgcolor=#d6d6d6
| 171436 ||  || — || September 10, 2007 || Kitt Peak || Spacewatch || — || align=right | 5.2 km || 
|-id=437 bgcolor=#E9E9E9
| 171437 ||  || — || September 10, 2007 || Kitt Peak || Spacewatch || — || align=right | 2.9 km || 
|-id=438 bgcolor=#E9E9E9
| 171438 ||  || — || September 10, 2007 || Kitt Peak || Spacewatch || — || align=right | 4.8 km || 
|-id=439 bgcolor=#fefefe
| 171439 ||  || — || September 10, 2007 || Mount Lemmon || Mount Lemmon Survey || NYS || align=right | 1.0 km || 
|-id=440 bgcolor=#E9E9E9
| 171440 ||  || — || September 11, 2007 || Mount Lemmon || Mount Lemmon Survey || — || align=right | 2.6 km || 
|-id=441 bgcolor=#E9E9E9
| 171441 ||  || — || September 11, 2007 || Catalina || CSS || — || align=right | 3.1 km || 
|-id=442 bgcolor=#fefefe
| 171442 ||  || — || September 11, 2007 || Kitt Peak || Spacewatch || V || align=right data-sort-value="0.81" | 810 m || 
|-id=443 bgcolor=#E9E9E9
| 171443 ||  || — || September 13, 2007 || Socorro || LINEAR || — || align=right | 3.1 km || 
|-id=444 bgcolor=#E9E9E9
| 171444 ||  || — || September 13, 2007 || Socorro || LINEAR || — || align=right | 2.7 km || 
|-id=445 bgcolor=#fefefe
| 171445 ||  || — || September 13, 2007 || Socorro || LINEAR || NYS || align=right | 1.1 km || 
|-id=446 bgcolor=#fefefe
| 171446 ||  || — || September 13, 2007 || Socorro || LINEAR || FLO || align=right | 1.2 km || 
|-id=447 bgcolor=#E9E9E9
| 171447 ||  || — || September 14, 2007 || Socorro || LINEAR || — || align=right | 4.5 km || 
|-id=448 bgcolor=#fefefe
| 171448 Guchaohao ||  ||  || September 11, 2007 || Purple Mountain || PMO NEO || — || align=right data-sort-value="0.91" | 910 m || 
|-id=449 bgcolor=#E9E9E9
| 171449 ||  || — || September 12, 2007 || Anderson Mesa || LONEOS || EUN || align=right | 2.1 km || 
|-id=450 bgcolor=#E9E9E9
| 171450 ||  || — || September 5, 2007 || Catalina || CSS || — || align=right | 3.8 km || 
|-id=451 bgcolor=#E9E9E9
| 171451 ||  || — || September 18, 2007 || Kitt Peak || Spacewatch || — || align=right | 2.1 km || 
|-id=452 bgcolor=#E9E9E9
| 171452 ||  || — || September 20, 2007 || Catalina || CSS || — || align=right | 2.9 km || 
|-id=453 bgcolor=#fefefe
| 171453 ||  || — || September 25, 2007 || Mount Lemmon || Mount Lemmon Survey || MAS || align=right | 1.1 km || 
|-id=454 bgcolor=#fefefe
| 171454 ||  || — || September 18, 2007 || Anderson Mesa || LONEOS || V || align=right | 1.2 km || 
|-id=455 bgcolor=#E9E9E9
| 171455 || 2007 TR || — || October 3, 2007 || RAS || A. Lowe || — || align=right | 4.3 km || 
|-id=456 bgcolor=#fefefe
| 171456 ||  || — || October 6, 2007 || Socorro || LINEAR || — || align=right | 1.0 km || 
|-id=457 bgcolor=#d6d6d6
| 171457 ||  || — || October 6, 2007 || Socorro || LINEAR || — || align=right | 4.1 km || 
|-id=458 bgcolor=#fefefe
| 171458 Pepaprats ||  ||  || October 7, 2007 || OAM || OAM Obs. || NYS || align=right data-sort-value="0.95" | 950 m || 
|-id=459 bgcolor=#E9E9E9
| 171459 ||  || — || October 5, 2007 || Hibiscus || Hibiscus Obs. || — || align=right | 2.3 km || 
|-id=460 bgcolor=#fefefe
| 171460 || 2170 P-L || — || September 24, 1960 || Palomar || PLS || — || align=right | 1.4 km || 
|-id=461 bgcolor=#E9E9E9
| 171461 || 2666 P-L || — || September 24, 1960 || Palomar || PLS || — || align=right | 2.1 km || 
|-id=462 bgcolor=#fefefe
| 171462 || 4518 P-L || — || September 24, 1960 || Palomar || PLS || — || align=right data-sort-value="0.94" | 940 m || 
|-id=463 bgcolor=#d6d6d6
| 171463 || 6272 P-L || — || September 24, 1960 || Palomar || PLS || HYG || align=right | 4.2 km || 
|-id=464 bgcolor=#E9E9E9
| 171464 || 6731 P-L || — || September 24, 1960 || Palomar || PLS || — || align=right | 2.0 km || 
|-id=465 bgcolor=#d6d6d6
| 171465 Evamaria || 6847 P-L ||  || September 24, 1960 || Palomar || PLS || 3:2 || align=right | 6.2 km || 
|-id=466 bgcolor=#fefefe
| 171466 || 6862 P-L || — || September 24, 1960 || Palomar || PLS || FLO || align=right data-sort-value="0.73" | 730 m || 
|-id=467 bgcolor=#E9E9E9
| 171467 || 2040 T-1 || — || March 25, 1971 || Palomar || PLS || — || align=right | 1.9 km || 
|-id=468 bgcolor=#fefefe
| 171468 || 2252 T-1 || — || March 25, 1971 || Palomar || PLS || NYS || align=right | 1.2 km || 
|-id=469 bgcolor=#d6d6d6
| 171469 || 1103 T-2 || — || September 29, 1973 || Palomar || PLS || EOS || align=right | 3.4 km || 
|-id=470 bgcolor=#d6d6d6
| 171470 || 1275 T-2 || — || September 29, 1973 || Palomar || PLS || — || align=right | 3.2 km || 
|-id=471 bgcolor=#E9E9E9
| 171471 || 2112 T-3 || — || October 16, 1977 || Palomar || PLS || — || align=right | 2.1 km || 
|-id=472 bgcolor=#E9E9E9
| 171472 || 2195 T-3 || — || October 16, 1977 || Palomar || PLS || — || align=right | 2.2 km || 
|-id=473 bgcolor=#fefefe
| 171473 || 3182 T-3 || — || October 16, 1977 || Palomar || PLS || — || align=right | 1.2 km || 
|-id=474 bgcolor=#fefefe
| 171474 || 5064 T-3 || — || October 16, 1977 || Palomar || PLS || V || align=right | 1.1 km || 
|-id=475 bgcolor=#fefefe
| 171475 || 5151 T-3 || — || October 16, 1977 || Palomar || PLS || V || align=right | 1.1 km || 
|-id=476 bgcolor=#fefefe
| 171476 ||  || — || September 15, 1993 || La Silla || E. W. Elst || — || align=right | 1.7 km || 
|-id=477 bgcolor=#E9E9E9
| 171477 ||  || — || December 16, 1993 || Kitt Peak || Spacewatch || GEF || align=right | 1.9 km || 
|-id=478 bgcolor=#fefefe
| 171478 ||  || — || March 7, 1994 || Kitt Peak || Spacewatch || — || align=right | 1.5 km || 
|-id=479 bgcolor=#fefefe
| 171479 ||  || — || April 6, 1994 || Kitt Peak || Spacewatch || NYS || align=right data-sort-value="0.90" | 900 m || 
|-id=480 bgcolor=#fefefe
| 171480 ||  || — || March 2, 1995 || Kitt Peak || Spacewatch || — || align=right data-sort-value="0.95" | 950 m || 
|-id=481 bgcolor=#d6d6d6
| 171481 ||  || — || September 18, 1995 || Kitt Peak || Spacewatch || — || align=right | 4.0 km || 
|-id=482 bgcolor=#d6d6d6
| 171482 ||  || — || September 22, 1995 || Kitt Peak || Spacewatch || — || align=right | 4.1 km || 
|-id=483 bgcolor=#fefefe
| 171483 ||  || — || September 26, 1995 || Kitt Peak || Spacewatch || MAS || align=right data-sort-value="0.80" | 800 m || 
|-id=484 bgcolor=#d6d6d6
| 171484 ||  || — || November 14, 1995 || Kitt Peak || Spacewatch || — || align=right | 4.8 km || 
|-id=485 bgcolor=#E9E9E9
| 171485 ||  || — || December 26, 1995 || Oizumi || T. Kobayashi || — || align=right | 3.5 km || 
|-id=486 bgcolor=#FFC2E0
| 171486 || 1996 MO || — || June 23, 1996 || Kitt Peak || Spacewatch || APO || align=right data-sort-value="0.74" | 740 m || 
|-id=487 bgcolor=#d6d6d6
| 171487 ||  || — || September 8, 1996 || Kitt Peak || Spacewatch || — || align=right | 3.7 km || 
|-id=488 bgcolor=#fefefe
| 171488 ||  || — || October 4, 1996 || Kitt Peak || Spacewatch || — || align=right | 1.7 km || 
|-id=489 bgcolor=#fefefe
| 171489 ||  || — || October 7, 1996 || Kitt Peak || Spacewatch || FLO || align=right data-sort-value="0.99" | 990 m || 
|-id=490 bgcolor=#fefefe
| 171490 ||  || — || October 9, 1996 || Kitt Peak || Spacewatch || V || align=right | 1.3 km || 
|-id=491 bgcolor=#fefefe
| 171491 ||  || — || October 6, 1996 || Kitt Peak || Spacewatch || — || align=right | 1.4 km || 
|-id=492 bgcolor=#fefefe
| 171492 ||  || — || November 7, 1996 || Prescott || P. G. Comba || — || align=right | 1.2 km || 
|-id=493 bgcolor=#d6d6d6
| 171493 ||  || — || November 5, 1996 || Kitt Peak || Spacewatch || — || align=right | 3.8 km || 
|-id=494 bgcolor=#d6d6d6
| 171494 ||  || — || December 1, 1996 || Kitt Peak || Spacewatch || — || align=right | 4.5 km || 
|-id=495 bgcolor=#fefefe
| 171495 ||  || — || December 5, 1996 || Kitt Peak || Spacewatch || — || align=right | 2.4 km || 
|-id=496 bgcolor=#fefefe
| 171496 ||  || — || December 14, 1996 || Kitt Peak || Spacewatch || MAS || align=right data-sort-value="0.95" | 950 m || 
|-id=497 bgcolor=#fefefe
| 171497 ||  || — || January 30, 1997 || Oizumi || T. Kobayashi || NYS || align=right | 1.3 km || 
|-id=498 bgcolor=#d6d6d6
| 171498 ||  || — || February 2, 1997 || Kitt Peak || Spacewatch || — || align=right | 6.7 km || 
|-id=499 bgcolor=#E9E9E9
| 171499 ||  || — || April 3, 1997 || Socorro || LINEAR || — || align=right | 1.9 km || 
|-id=500 bgcolor=#fefefe
| 171500 ||  || — || April 5, 1997 || Socorro || LINEAR || MAS || align=right | 1.3 km || 
|}

171501–171600 

|-bgcolor=#E9E9E9
| 171501 ||  || — || June 26, 1997 || Kitt Peak || Spacewatch || — || align=right | 3.3 km || 
|-id=502 bgcolor=#E9E9E9
| 171502 ||  || — || July 3, 1997 || Kitt Peak || Spacewatch || MIT || align=right | 5.1 km || 
|-id=503 bgcolor=#fefefe
| 171503 ||  || — || February 23, 1998 || Kitt Peak || Spacewatch || NYS || align=right | 2.5 km || 
|-id=504 bgcolor=#fefefe
| 171504 ||  || — || March 1, 1998 || Kitt Peak || Spacewatch || V || align=right | 1.0 km || 
|-id=505 bgcolor=#fefefe
| 171505 ||  || — || April 20, 1998 || Socorro || LINEAR || — || align=right | 1.2 km || 
|-id=506 bgcolor=#fefefe
| 171506 ||  || — || April 20, 1998 || Socorro || LINEAR || — || align=right | 1.4 km || 
|-id=507 bgcolor=#fefefe
| 171507 ||  || — || April 23, 1998 || Socorro || LINEAR || — || align=right | 1.5 km || 
|-id=508 bgcolor=#E9E9E9
| 171508 ||  || — || June 19, 1998 || Caussols || ODAS || AER || align=right | 2.3 km || 
|-id=509 bgcolor=#E9E9E9
| 171509 ||  || — || August 17, 1998 || Socorro || LINEAR || — || align=right | 2.1 km || 
|-id=510 bgcolor=#E9E9E9
| 171510 ||  || — || August 17, 1998 || Socorro || LINEAR || — || align=right | 2.6 km || 
|-id=511 bgcolor=#E9E9E9
| 171511 ||  || — || August 24, 1998 || Socorro || LINEAR || — || align=right | 2.0 km || 
|-id=512 bgcolor=#E9E9E9
| 171512 ||  || — || September 14, 1998 || Ondřejov || L. Kotková || EUN || align=right | 2.1 km || 
|-id=513 bgcolor=#d6d6d6
| 171513 ||  || — || September 14, 1998 || Socorro || LINEAR || SHU3:2 || align=right | 9.8 km || 
|-id=514 bgcolor=#E9E9E9
| 171514 ||  || — || September 17, 1998 || Anderson Mesa || LONEOS || ADE || align=right | 3.9 km || 
|-id=515 bgcolor=#E9E9E9
| 171515 ||  || — || September 27, 1998 || Kitt Peak || Spacewatch || — || align=right | 3.8 km || 
|-id=516 bgcolor=#E9E9E9
| 171516 ||  || — || September 26, 1998 || Socorro || LINEAR || — || align=right | 1.8 km || 
|-id=517 bgcolor=#E9E9E9
| 171517 ||  || — || September 26, 1998 || Socorro || LINEAR || — || align=right | 2.9 km || 
|-id=518 bgcolor=#E9E9E9
| 171518 || 1998 TO || — || October 10, 1998 || Goodricke-Pigott || R. A. Tucker || — || align=right | 2.8 km || 
|-id=519 bgcolor=#E9E9E9
| 171519 ||  || — || October 28, 1998 || Socorro || LINEAR || — || align=right | 2.6 km || 
|-id=520 bgcolor=#E9E9E9
| 171520 ||  || — || January 13, 1999 || Kitt Peak || Spacewatch || — || align=right | 2.7 km || 
|-id=521 bgcolor=#E9E9E9
| 171521 ||  || — || February 7, 1999 || Nachi-Katsuura || Y. Shimizu, T. Urata || — || align=right | 3.6 km || 
|-id=522 bgcolor=#FA8072
| 171522 ||  || — || February 10, 1999 || Socorro || LINEAR || — || align=right | 1.4 km || 
|-id=523 bgcolor=#E9E9E9
| 171523 ||  || — || February 10, 1999 || Socorro || LINEAR || — || align=right | 2.8 km || 
|-id=524 bgcolor=#d6d6d6
| 171524 ||  || — || February 12, 1999 || Socorro || LINEAR || — || align=right | 6.3 km || 
|-id=525 bgcolor=#E9E9E9
| 171525 ||  || — || February 12, 1999 || Socorro || LINEAR || — || align=right | 4.0 km || 
|-id=526 bgcolor=#d6d6d6
| 171526 ||  || — || April 19, 1999 || Kitt Peak || Spacewatch || EOS || align=right | 3.3 km || 
|-id=527 bgcolor=#fefefe
| 171527 ||  || — || April 17, 1999 || Socorro || LINEAR || — || align=right | 1.5 km || 
|-id=528 bgcolor=#d6d6d6
| 171528 ||  || — || May 10, 1999 || Socorro || LINEAR || LIX || align=right | 6.9 km || 
|-id=529 bgcolor=#d6d6d6
| 171529 ||  || — || May 12, 1999 || Socorro || LINEAR || — || align=right | 5.1 km || 
|-id=530 bgcolor=#fefefe
| 171530 ||  || — || May 13, 1999 || Socorro || LINEAR || — || align=right | 1.2 km || 
|-id=531 bgcolor=#fefefe
| 171531 ||  || — || May 13, 1999 || Socorro || LINEAR || — || align=right | 1.1 km || 
|-id=532 bgcolor=#d6d6d6
| 171532 ||  || — || May 15, 1999 || Catalina || CSS || — || align=right | 4.8 km || 
|-id=533 bgcolor=#fefefe
| 171533 ||  || — || May 18, 1999 || Socorro || LINEAR || FLO || align=right | 1.3 km || 
|-id=534 bgcolor=#fefefe
| 171534 ||  || — || July 13, 1999 || Socorro || LINEAR || — || align=right | 1.7 km || 
|-id=535 bgcolor=#fefefe
| 171535 ||  || — || September 7, 1999 || Socorro || LINEAR || — || align=right | 1.6 km || 
|-id=536 bgcolor=#fefefe
| 171536 ||  || — || September 7, 1999 || Socorro || LINEAR || — || align=right | 1.8 km || 
|-id=537 bgcolor=#fefefe
| 171537 ||  || — || September 7, 1999 || Socorro || LINEAR || NYS || align=right | 1.0 km || 
|-id=538 bgcolor=#fefefe
| 171538 ||  || — || September 7, 1999 || Socorro || LINEAR || — || align=right | 1.6 km || 
|-id=539 bgcolor=#fefefe
| 171539 ||  || — || September 7, 1999 || Socorro || LINEAR || NYS || align=right | 2.8 km || 
|-id=540 bgcolor=#fefefe
| 171540 ||  || — || September 7, 1999 || Socorro || LINEAR || — || align=right | 1.3 km || 
|-id=541 bgcolor=#fefefe
| 171541 ||  || — || September 8, 1999 || Socorro || LINEAR || V || align=right | 1.2 km || 
|-id=542 bgcolor=#E9E9E9
| 171542 ||  || — || September 9, 1999 || Socorro || LINEAR || — || align=right | 1.8 km || 
|-id=543 bgcolor=#fefefe
| 171543 ||  || — || September 9, 1999 || Socorro || LINEAR || — || align=right | 1.9 km || 
|-id=544 bgcolor=#fefefe
| 171544 ||  || — || September 9, 1999 || Socorro || LINEAR || V || align=right | 1.5 km || 
|-id=545 bgcolor=#fefefe
| 171545 ||  || — || September 9, 1999 || Socorro || LINEAR || — || align=right | 1.2 km || 
|-id=546 bgcolor=#fefefe
| 171546 ||  || — || September 9, 1999 || Socorro || LINEAR || FLO || align=right | 3.4 km || 
|-id=547 bgcolor=#fefefe
| 171547 ||  || — || September 9, 1999 || Socorro || LINEAR || — || align=right | 3.9 km || 
|-id=548 bgcolor=#fefefe
| 171548 ||  || — || September 9, 1999 || Socorro || LINEAR || NYS || align=right | 1.2 km || 
|-id=549 bgcolor=#fefefe
| 171549 ||  || — || September 8, 1999 || Socorro || LINEAR || V || align=right | 1.1 km || 
|-id=550 bgcolor=#fefefe
| 171550 ||  || — || September 30, 1999 || Catalina || CSS || — || align=right | 1.5 km || 
|-id=551 bgcolor=#fefefe
| 171551 ||  || — || October 7, 1999 || Monte Agliale || S. Donati || NYS || align=right | 1.4 km || 
|-id=552 bgcolor=#fefefe
| 171552 ||  || — || October 10, 1999 || Gnosca || S. Sposetti || NYS || align=right | 4.3 km || 
|-id=553 bgcolor=#E9E9E9
| 171553 ||  || — || October 3, 1999 || Catalina || CSS || — || align=right | 1.6 km || 
|-id=554 bgcolor=#fefefe
| 171554 ||  || — || October 6, 1999 || Kitt Peak || Spacewatch || MAS || align=right | 1.3 km || 
|-id=555 bgcolor=#fefefe
| 171555 ||  || — || October 10, 1999 || Kitt Peak || Spacewatch || — || align=right | 1.1 km || 
|-id=556 bgcolor=#fefefe
| 171556 ||  || — || October 6, 1999 || Socorro || LINEAR || KLI || align=right | 3.7 km || 
|-id=557 bgcolor=#E9E9E9
| 171557 ||  || — || October 6, 1999 || Socorro || LINEAR || — || align=right | 1.8 km || 
|-id=558 bgcolor=#fefefe
| 171558 ||  || — || October 7, 1999 || Socorro || LINEAR || — || align=right | 1.4 km || 
|-id=559 bgcolor=#fefefe
| 171559 ||  || — || October 7, 1999 || Socorro || LINEAR || — || align=right | 1.6 km || 
|-id=560 bgcolor=#fefefe
| 171560 ||  || — || October 9, 1999 || Socorro || LINEAR || — || align=right | 1.3 km || 
|-id=561 bgcolor=#fefefe
| 171561 ||  || — || October 10, 1999 || Socorro || LINEAR || NYS || align=right | 1.0 km || 
|-id=562 bgcolor=#d6d6d6
| 171562 ||  || — || October 10, 1999 || Socorro || LINEAR || SHU3:2 || align=right | 7.2 km || 
|-id=563 bgcolor=#fefefe
| 171563 ||  || — || October 10, 1999 || Socorro || LINEAR || V || align=right | 1.0 km || 
|-id=564 bgcolor=#fefefe
| 171564 ||  || — || October 1, 1999 || Catalina || CSS || V || align=right | 1.1 km || 
|-id=565 bgcolor=#fefefe
| 171565 ||  || — || October 5, 1999 || Socorro || LINEAR || — || align=right | 4.2 km || 
|-id=566 bgcolor=#E9E9E9
| 171566 ||  || — || October 3, 1999 || Socorro || LINEAR || — || align=right | 1.9 km || 
|-id=567 bgcolor=#fefefe
| 171567 ||  || — || October 9, 1999 || Socorro || LINEAR || V || align=right | 1.3 km || 
|-id=568 bgcolor=#fefefe
| 171568 ||  || — || October 10, 1999 || Socorro || LINEAR || FLO || align=right | 1.1 km || 
|-id=569 bgcolor=#E9E9E9
| 171569 ||  || — || October 16, 1999 || Bergisch Gladbach || W. Bickel || — || align=right | 1.00 km || 
|-id=570 bgcolor=#fefefe
| 171570 ||  || — || October 31, 1999 || Kitt Peak || Spacewatch || — || align=right data-sort-value="0.94" | 940 m || 
|-id=571 bgcolor=#fefefe
| 171571 ||  || — || October 29, 1999 || Anderson Mesa || LONEOS || — || align=right | 2.0 km || 
|-id=572 bgcolor=#fefefe
| 171572 ||  || — || October 21, 1999 || Socorro || LINEAR || H || align=right | 1.4 km || 
|-id=573 bgcolor=#fefefe
| 171573 ||  || — || October 28, 1999 || Catalina || CSS || — || align=right | 1.7 km || 
|-id=574 bgcolor=#E9E9E9
| 171574 ||  || — || November 5, 1999 || Višnjan Observatory || K. Korlević || — || align=right | 1.6 km || 
|-id=575 bgcolor=#fefefe
| 171575 ||  || — || November 6, 1999 || Fountain Hills || C. W. Juels || NYS || align=right | 3.6 km || 
|-id=576 bgcolor=#FFC2E0
| 171576 ||  || — || November 7, 1999 || Socorro || LINEAR || APOPHA || align=right data-sort-value="0.68" | 680 m || 
|-id=577 bgcolor=#fefefe
| 171577 ||  || — || November 2, 1999 || Kitt Peak || Spacewatch || V || align=right | 1.1 km || 
|-id=578 bgcolor=#fefefe
| 171578 ||  || — || November 12, 1999 || Višnjan Observatory || K. Korlević || — || align=right | 1.1 km || 
|-id=579 bgcolor=#fefefe
| 171579 ||  || — || November 12, 1999 || Gnosca || S. Sposetti || NYS || align=right | 1.7 km || 
|-id=580 bgcolor=#fefefe
| 171580 ||  || — || November 4, 1999 || Kitt Peak || Spacewatch || NYS || align=right | 1.0 km || 
|-id=581 bgcolor=#E9E9E9
| 171581 ||  || — || November 4, 1999 || Socorro || LINEAR || ADE || align=right | 3.6 km || 
|-id=582 bgcolor=#fefefe
| 171582 ||  || — || November 4, 1999 || Socorro || LINEAR || NYS || align=right | 2.5 km || 
|-id=583 bgcolor=#fefefe
| 171583 ||  || — || November 4, 1999 || Socorro || LINEAR || NYS || align=right | 1.4 km || 
|-id=584 bgcolor=#E9E9E9
| 171584 ||  || — || November 9, 1999 || Socorro || LINEAR || — || align=right | 1.5 km || 
|-id=585 bgcolor=#d6d6d6
| 171585 ||  || — || November 9, 1999 || Socorro || LINEAR || HIL3:2 || align=right | 9.2 km || 
|-id=586 bgcolor=#fefefe
| 171586 ||  || — || November 14, 1999 || Socorro || LINEAR || ERI || align=right | 2.8 km || 
|-id=587 bgcolor=#E9E9E9
| 171587 ||  || — || November 14, 1999 || Socorro || LINEAR || — || align=right | 2.2 km || 
|-id=588 bgcolor=#fefefe
| 171588 Náprstek ||  ||  || November 26, 1999 || Kleť || J. Tichá, M. Tichý || NYS || align=right | 1.4 km || 
|-id=589 bgcolor=#fefefe
| 171589 ||  || — || November 28, 1999 || Kitt Peak || Spacewatch || H || align=right data-sort-value="0.82" | 820 m || 
|-id=590 bgcolor=#E9E9E9
| 171590 ||  || — || November 28, 1999 || Višnjan Observatory || K. Korlević || — || align=right | 1.7 km || 
|-id=591 bgcolor=#E9E9E9
| 171591 ||  || — || November 28, 1999 || Kitt Peak || Spacewatch || — || align=right | 1.2 km || 
|-id=592 bgcolor=#fefefe
| 171592 ||  || — || November 28, 1999 || Kitt Peak || Spacewatch || — || align=right | 1.6 km || 
|-id=593 bgcolor=#E9E9E9
| 171593 ||  || — || December 7, 1999 || Socorro || LINEAR || — || align=right | 1.6 km || 
|-id=594 bgcolor=#E9E9E9
| 171594 ||  || — || December 7, 1999 || Socorro || LINEAR || — || align=right | 1.9 km || 
|-id=595 bgcolor=#E9E9E9
| 171595 ||  || — || December 7, 1999 || Socorro || LINEAR || — || align=right | 2.0 km || 
|-id=596 bgcolor=#fefefe
| 171596 ||  || — || December 7, 1999 || Socorro || LINEAR || MAS || align=right | 1.1 km || 
|-id=597 bgcolor=#E9E9E9
| 171597 ||  || — || December 7, 1999 || Socorro || LINEAR || — || align=right | 2.2 km || 
|-id=598 bgcolor=#E9E9E9
| 171598 ||  || — || December 7, 1999 || Socorro || LINEAR || — || align=right | 2.0 km || 
|-id=599 bgcolor=#E9E9E9
| 171599 ||  || — || December 7, 1999 || Socorro || LINEAR || RAF || align=right | 1.4 km || 
|-id=600 bgcolor=#d6d6d6
| 171600 ||  || — || December 7, 1999 || Catalina || CSS || HIL3:2 || align=right | 10 km || 
|}

171601–171700 

|-bgcolor=#fefefe
| 171601 ||  || — || December 8, 1999 || Socorro || LINEAR || H || align=right | 1.2 km || 
|-id=602 bgcolor=#E9E9E9
| 171602 ||  || — || December 10, 1999 || Socorro || LINEAR || EUN || align=right | 2.9 km || 
|-id=603 bgcolor=#E9E9E9
| 171603 ||  || — || December 10, 1999 || Socorro || LINEAR || — || align=right | 2.1 km || 
|-id=604 bgcolor=#E9E9E9
| 171604 ||  || — || December 13, 1999 || Kitt Peak || Spacewatch || — || align=right | 1.7 km || 
|-id=605 bgcolor=#E9E9E9
| 171605 ||  || — || December 5, 1999 || Socorro || LINEAR || EUN || align=right | 1.9 km || 
|-id=606 bgcolor=#E9E9E9
| 171606 ||  || — || December 31, 1999 || Kitt Peak || Spacewatch || — || align=right | 1.6 km || 
|-id=607 bgcolor=#E9E9E9
| 171607 ||  || — || January 3, 2000 || Socorro || LINEAR || MIT || align=right | 4.1 km || 
|-id=608 bgcolor=#E9E9E9
| 171608 ||  || — || January 4, 2000 || Socorro || LINEAR || — || align=right | 2.9 km || 
|-id=609 bgcolor=#E9E9E9
| 171609 ||  || — || January 5, 2000 || Socorro || LINEAR || — || align=right | 1.4 km || 
|-id=610 bgcolor=#fefefe
| 171610 ||  || — || January 4, 2000 || Socorro || LINEAR || H || align=right | 1.1 km || 
|-id=611 bgcolor=#E9E9E9
| 171611 ||  || — || January 5, 2000 || Socorro || LINEAR || — || align=right | 1.8 km || 
|-id=612 bgcolor=#E9E9E9
| 171612 ||  || — || January 7, 2000 || Anderson Mesa || LONEOS || EUN || align=right | 1.9 km || 
|-id=613 bgcolor=#E9E9E9
| 171613 ||  || — || January 11, 2000 || Socorro || LINEAR || — || align=right | 4.2 km || 
|-id=614 bgcolor=#E9E9E9
| 171614 ||  || — || January 27, 2000 || Socorro || LINEAR || — || align=right | 2.0 km || 
|-id=615 bgcolor=#E9E9E9
| 171615 ||  || — || January 26, 2000 || Kitt Peak || Spacewatch || HEN || align=right | 1.5 km || 
|-id=616 bgcolor=#E9E9E9
| 171616 ||  || — || January 30, 2000 || Kitt Peak || Spacewatch || — || align=right | 2.0 km || 
|-id=617 bgcolor=#E9E9E9
| 171617 ||  || — || January 30, 2000 || Catalina || CSS || — || align=right | 1.4 km || 
|-id=618 bgcolor=#E9E9E9
| 171618 ||  || — || January 30, 2000 || Kitt Peak || Spacewatch || — || align=right | 2.0 km || 
|-id=619 bgcolor=#E9E9E9
| 171619 ||  || — || February 2, 2000 || Modra || A. Galád, P. Kolény || — || align=right | 2.6 km || 
|-id=620 bgcolor=#FA8072
| 171620 ||  || — || February 4, 2000 || Socorro || LINEAR || H || align=right | 1.8 km || 
|-id=621 bgcolor=#fefefe
| 171621 ||  || — || February 2, 2000 || Socorro || LINEAR || H || align=right | 1.1 km || 
|-id=622 bgcolor=#E9E9E9
| 171622 ||  || — || February 11, 2000 || Kitt Peak || Spacewatch || — || align=right | 1.4 km || 
|-id=623 bgcolor=#E9E9E9
| 171623 ||  || — || February 8, 2000 || Kitt Peak || Spacewatch || — || align=right | 1.8 km || 
|-id=624 bgcolor=#E9E9E9
| 171624 Nicolemartin ||  ||  || February 5, 2000 || Kitt Peak || M. W. Buie || — || align=right | 2.7 km || 
|-id=625 bgcolor=#E9E9E9
| 171625 ||  || — || February 7, 2000 || Kitt Peak || Spacewatch || — || align=right | 3.2 km || 
|-id=626 bgcolor=#E9E9E9
| 171626 ||  || — || February 11, 2000 || Socorro || LINEAR || — || align=right | 1.5 km || 
|-id=627 bgcolor=#E9E9E9
| 171627 ||  || — || February 4, 2000 || Kitt Peak || Spacewatch || — || align=right | 2.4 km || 
|-id=628 bgcolor=#E9E9E9
| 171628 ||  || — || February 29, 2000 || Socorro || LINEAR || MRX || align=right | 2.3 km || 
|-id=629 bgcolor=#E9E9E9
| 171629 ||  || — || February 29, 2000 || Socorro || LINEAR || — || align=right | 3.4 km || 
|-id=630 bgcolor=#E9E9E9
| 171630 ||  || — || February 28, 2000 || Socorro || LINEAR || — || align=right | 2.3 km || 
|-id=631 bgcolor=#E9E9E9
| 171631 ||  || — || February 29, 2000 || Socorro || LINEAR || — || align=right | 1.8 km || 
|-id=632 bgcolor=#E9E9E9
| 171632 ||  || — || February 29, 2000 || Socorro || LINEAR || — || align=right | 2.4 km || 
|-id=633 bgcolor=#E9E9E9
| 171633 ||  || — || February 29, 2000 || Socorro || LINEAR || — || align=right | 2.7 km || 
|-id=634 bgcolor=#d6d6d6
| 171634 ||  || — || March 3, 2000 || Socorro || LINEAR || — || align=right | 5.1 km || 
|-id=635 bgcolor=#E9E9E9
| 171635 ||  || — || March 9, 2000 || Socorro || LINEAR || — || align=right | 1.4 km || 
|-id=636 bgcolor=#fefefe
| 171636 ||  || — || March 10, 2000 || Socorro || LINEAR || — || align=right | 1.6 km || 
|-id=637 bgcolor=#E9E9E9
| 171637 ||  || — || March 5, 2000 || Socorro || LINEAR || — || align=right | 2.1 km || 
|-id=638 bgcolor=#E9E9E9
| 171638 ||  || — || March 9, 2000 || Socorro || LINEAR || EUN || align=right | 2.4 km || 
|-id=639 bgcolor=#d6d6d6
| 171639 ||  || — || March 10, 2000 || Kitt Peak || Spacewatch || K-2 || align=right | 2.4 km || 
|-id=640 bgcolor=#E9E9E9
| 171640 ||  || — || March 11, 2000 || Anderson Mesa || LONEOS || — || align=right | 1.9 km || 
|-id=641 bgcolor=#E9E9E9
| 171641 ||  || — || March 11, 2000 || Anderson Mesa || LONEOS || JUN || align=right | 1.7 km || 
|-id=642 bgcolor=#E9E9E9
| 171642 ||  || — || March 11, 2000 || Catalina || CSS || JUN || align=right | 5.2 km || 
|-id=643 bgcolor=#E9E9E9
| 171643 ||  || — || March 5, 2000 || Socorro || LINEAR || — || align=right | 2.1 km || 
|-id=644 bgcolor=#E9E9E9
| 171644 ||  || — || March 29, 2000 || Kitt Peak || Spacewatch || AST || align=right | 1.8 km || 
|-id=645 bgcolor=#d6d6d6
| 171645 ||  || — || March 29, 2000 || Kitt Peak || Spacewatch || — || align=right | 5.2 km || 
|-id=646 bgcolor=#E9E9E9
| 171646 ||  || — || March 30, 2000 || Kitt Peak || Spacewatch || AGN || align=right | 1.7 km || 
|-id=647 bgcolor=#E9E9E9
| 171647 ||  || — || March 29, 2000 || Socorro || LINEAR || — || align=right | 2.6 km || 
|-id=648 bgcolor=#E9E9E9
| 171648 ||  || — || March 27, 2000 || Anderson Mesa || LONEOS || — || align=right | 4.5 km || 
|-id=649 bgcolor=#E9E9E9
| 171649 ||  || — || March 29, 2000 || Socorro || LINEAR || — || align=right | 2.9 km || 
|-id=650 bgcolor=#E9E9E9
| 171650 ||  || — || March 27, 2000 || Anderson Mesa || LONEOS || — || align=right | 3.3 km || 
|-id=651 bgcolor=#E9E9E9
| 171651 ||  || — || April 5, 2000 || Socorro || LINEAR || — || align=right | 3.4 km || 
|-id=652 bgcolor=#E9E9E9
| 171652 ||  || — || April 5, 2000 || Socorro || LINEAR || MIS || align=right | 4.3 km || 
|-id=653 bgcolor=#E9E9E9
| 171653 ||  || — || April 5, 2000 || Socorro || LINEAR || — || align=right | 3.2 km || 
|-id=654 bgcolor=#E9E9E9
| 171654 ||  || — || April 11, 2000 || Kitt Peak || Spacewatch || — || align=right | 3.1 km || 
|-id=655 bgcolor=#E9E9E9
| 171655 ||  || — || April 4, 2000 || Anderson Mesa || LONEOS || JUN || align=right | 1.6 km || 
|-id=656 bgcolor=#E9E9E9
| 171656 ||  || — || April 4, 2000 || Anderson Mesa || LONEOS || MIS || align=right | 3.4 km || 
|-id=657 bgcolor=#E9E9E9
| 171657 ||  || — || April 2, 2000 || Anderson Mesa || LONEOS || — || align=right | 1.8 km || 
|-id=658 bgcolor=#E9E9E9
| 171658 ||  || — || April 30, 2000 || Socorro || LINEAR || — || align=right | 7.2 km || 
|-id=659 bgcolor=#d6d6d6
| 171659 ||  || — || April 29, 2000 || Socorro || LINEAR || — || align=right | 6.7 km || 
|-id=660 bgcolor=#E9E9E9
| 171660 ||  || — || May 6, 2000 || Socorro || LINEAR || — || align=right | 3.8 km || 
|-id=661 bgcolor=#d6d6d6
| 171661 ||  || — || May 9, 2000 || Socorro || LINEAR || Tj (2.99) || align=right | 5.0 km || 
|-id=662 bgcolor=#E9E9E9
| 171662 ||  || — || May 7, 2000 || Socorro || LINEAR || — || align=right | 3.8 km || 
|-id=663 bgcolor=#d6d6d6
| 171663 ||  || — || May 7, 2000 || Socorro || LINEAR || — || align=right | 4.8 km || 
|-id=664 bgcolor=#d6d6d6
| 171664 || 2000 KW || — || May 24, 2000 || Kitt Peak || Spacewatch || — || align=right | 3.5 km || 
|-id=665 bgcolor=#FA8072
| 171665 ||  || — || May 28, 2000 || Socorro || LINEAR || — || align=right | 1.1 km || 
|-id=666 bgcolor=#fefefe
| 171666 ||  || — || May 30, 2000 || Kitt Peak || Spacewatch || — || align=right | 1.0 km || 
|-id=667 bgcolor=#fefefe
| 171667 ||  || — || July 5, 2000 || Anderson Mesa || LONEOS || — || align=right | 1.1 km || 
|-id=668 bgcolor=#fefefe
| 171668 ||  || — || July 5, 2000 || Anderson Mesa || LONEOS || — || align=right | 1.5 km || 
|-id=669 bgcolor=#d6d6d6
| 171669 ||  || — || July 29, 2000 || Anderson Mesa || LONEOS || EOS || align=right | 3.6 km || 
|-id=670 bgcolor=#fefefe
| 171670 ||  || — || July 29, 2000 || Anderson Mesa || LONEOS || — || align=right | 1.4 km || 
|-id=671 bgcolor=#FA8072
| 171671 ||  || — || August 1, 2000 || Socorro || LINEAR || — || align=right | 1.0 km || 
|-id=672 bgcolor=#fefefe
| 171672 ||  || — || August 24, 2000 || Socorro || LINEAR || — || align=right | 1.2 km || 
|-id=673 bgcolor=#FA8072
| 171673 ||  || — || August 26, 2000 || Socorro || LINEAR || — || align=right | 1.3 km || 
|-id=674 bgcolor=#fefefe
| 171674 ||  || — || August 24, 2000 || Socorro || LINEAR || — || align=right | 1.4 km || 
|-id=675 bgcolor=#fefefe
| 171675 ||  || — || August 26, 2000 || Socorro || LINEAR || FLO || align=right | 1.2 km || 
|-id=676 bgcolor=#fefefe
| 171676 ||  || — || August 26, 2000 || Socorro || LINEAR || — || align=right | 1.8 km || 
|-id=677 bgcolor=#d6d6d6
| 171677 ||  || — || August 29, 2000 || Socorro || LINEAR || THM || align=right | 5.4 km || 
|-id=678 bgcolor=#d6d6d6
| 171678 ||  || — || August 31, 2000 || Socorro || LINEAR || — || align=right | 5.3 km || 
|-id=679 bgcolor=#d6d6d6
| 171679 ||  || — || August 31, 2000 || Kitt Peak || Spacewatch || — || align=right | 5.2 km || 
|-id=680 bgcolor=#fefefe
| 171680 ||  || — || September 1, 2000 || Socorro || LINEAR || — || align=right | 1.2 km || 
|-id=681 bgcolor=#fefefe
| 171681 ||  || — || September 1, 2000 || Socorro || LINEAR || — || align=right | 1.5 km || 
|-id=682 bgcolor=#fefefe
| 171682 ||  || — || September 1, 2000 || Socorro || LINEAR || FLO || align=right | 1.2 km || 
|-id=683 bgcolor=#fefefe
| 171683 ||  || — || September 1, 2000 || Socorro || LINEAR || — || align=right | 1.2 km || 
|-id=684 bgcolor=#fefefe
| 171684 ||  || — || September 7, 2000 || Elmira || A. J. Cecce || FLO || align=right | 1.3 km || 
|-id=685 bgcolor=#fefefe
| 171685 ||  || — || September 3, 2000 || Socorro || LINEAR || — || align=right | 1.3 km || 
|-id=686 bgcolor=#fefefe
| 171686 ||  || — || September 21, 2000 || Socorro || LINEAR || — || align=right | 1.1 km || 
|-id=687 bgcolor=#d6d6d6
| 171687 ||  || — || September 23, 2000 || Socorro || LINEAR || — || align=right | 5.9 km || 
|-id=688 bgcolor=#d6d6d6
| 171688 ||  || — || September 23, 2000 || Socorro || LINEAR || — || align=right | 6.3 km || 
|-id=689 bgcolor=#fefefe
| 171689 ||  || — || September 23, 2000 || Socorro || LINEAR || — || align=right | 1.2 km || 
|-id=690 bgcolor=#fefefe
| 171690 ||  || — || September 24, 2000 || Socorro || LINEAR || — || align=right | 1.2 km || 
|-id=691 bgcolor=#fefefe
| 171691 ||  || — || September 23, 2000 || Socorro || LINEAR || FLO || align=right | 1.3 km || 
|-id=692 bgcolor=#fefefe
| 171692 ||  || — || September 24, 2000 || Socorro || LINEAR || — || align=right | 1.3 km || 
|-id=693 bgcolor=#fefefe
| 171693 ||  || — || September 23, 2000 || Socorro || LINEAR || — || align=right | 1.0 km || 
|-id=694 bgcolor=#fefefe
| 171694 ||  || — || September 24, 2000 || Socorro || LINEAR || — || align=right | 1.2 km || 
|-id=695 bgcolor=#fefefe
| 171695 ||  || — || September 24, 2000 || Socorro || LINEAR || — || align=right | 1.3 km || 
|-id=696 bgcolor=#fefefe
| 171696 ||  || — || September 23, 2000 || Socorro || LINEAR || FLO || align=right | 1.1 km || 
|-id=697 bgcolor=#fefefe
| 171697 ||  || — || September 23, 2000 || Socorro || LINEAR || FLO || align=right | 1.00 km || 
|-id=698 bgcolor=#fefefe
| 171698 ||  || — || September 24, 2000 || Socorro || LINEAR || — || align=right | 4.5 km || 
|-id=699 bgcolor=#fefefe
| 171699 ||  || — || September 23, 2000 || Socorro || LINEAR || — || align=right | 1.3 km || 
|-id=700 bgcolor=#fefefe
| 171700 ||  || — || September 25, 2000 || Socorro || LINEAR || V || align=right | 1.2 km || 
|}

171701–171800 

|-bgcolor=#fefefe
| 171701 ||  || — || September 25, 2000 || Socorro || LINEAR || — || align=right | 1.4 km || 
|-id=702 bgcolor=#fefefe
| 171702 ||  || — || September 30, 2000 || Socorro || LINEAR || — || align=right | 1.3 km || 
|-id=703 bgcolor=#fefefe
| 171703 ||  || — || September 27, 2000 || Socorro || LINEAR || — || align=right | 1.2 km || 
|-id=704 bgcolor=#fefefe
| 171704 ||  || — || September 27, 2000 || Socorro || LINEAR || PHO || align=right | 2.0 km || 
|-id=705 bgcolor=#fefefe
| 171705 ||  || — || September 28, 2000 || Socorro || LINEAR || FLO || align=right | 1.1 km || 
|-id=706 bgcolor=#fefefe
| 171706 ||  || — || September 30, 2000 || Socorro || LINEAR || FLO || align=right | 1.9 km || 
|-id=707 bgcolor=#fefefe
| 171707 ||  || — || September 30, 2000 || Socorro || LINEAR || — || align=right | 1.4 km || 
|-id=708 bgcolor=#fefefe
| 171708 ||  || — || October 2, 2000 || Socorro || LINEAR || — || align=right | 1.3 km || 
|-id=709 bgcolor=#fefefe
| 171709 ||  || — || October 1, 2000 || Socorro || LINEAR || FLO || align=right data-sort-value="0.92" | 920 m || 
|-id=710 bgcolor=#fefefe
| 171710 ||  || — || October 1, 2000 || Socorro || LINEAR || — || align=right | 1.5 km || 
|-id=711 bgcolor=#fefefe
| 171711 ||  || — || October 3, 2000 || Socorro || LINEAR || — || align=right | 1.4 km || 
|-id=712 bgcolor=#fefefe
| 171712 ||  || — || October 24, 2000 || Socorro || LINEAR || — || align=right | 1.7 km || 
|-id=713 bgcolor=#fefefe
| 171713 ||  || — || October 24, 2000 || Socorro || LINEAR || — || align=right | 1.2 km || 
|-id=714 bgcolor=#fefefe
| 171714 ||  || — || October 24, 2000 || Socorro || LINEAR || — || align=right | 1.2 km || 
|-id=715 bgcolor=#fefefe
| 171715 ||  || — || October 24, 2000 || Socorro || LINEAR || — || align=right | 1.3 km || 
|-id=716 bgcolor=#fefefe
| 171716 ||  || — || October 25, 2000 || Socorro || LINEAR || — || align=right | 1.4 km || 
|-id=717 bgcolor=#fefefe
| 171717 ||  || — || October 25, 2000 || Socorro || LINEAR || — || align=right | 1.4 km || 
|-id=718 bgcolor=#fefefe
| 171718 ||  || — || October 25, 2000 || Socorro || LINEAR || — || align=right | 1.4 km || 
|-id=719 bgcolor=#fefefe
| 171719 ||  || — || October 31, 2000 || Socorro || LINEAR || — || align=right | 1.0 km || 
|-id=720 bgcolor=#fefefe
| 171720 ||  || — || October 25, 2000 || Socorro || LINEAR || V || align=right data-sort-value="0.93" | 930 m || 
|-id=721 bgcolor=#fefefe
| 171721 ||  || — || October 25, 2000 || Socorro || LINEAR || — || align=right | 1.5 km || 
|-id=722 bgcolor=#fefefe
| 171722 ||  || — || October 31, 2000 || Socorro || LINEAR || — || align=right | 1.4 km || 
|-id=723 bgcolor=#fefefe
| 171723 ||  || — || November 1, 2000 || Socorro || LINEAR || — || align=right | 1.4 km || 
|-id=724 bgcolor=#fefefe
| 171724 || 2000 WG || — || November 16, 2000 || Kitt Peak || Spacewatch || — || align=right | 1.1 km || 
|-id=725 bgcolor=#fefefe
| 171725 ||  || — || November 21, 2000 || Socorro || LINEAR || FLO || align=right | 1.1 km || 
|-id=726 bgcolor=#fefefe
| 171726 ||  || — || November 21, 2000 || Needville || Needville Obs. || — || align=right data-sort-value="0.96" | 960 m || 
|-id=727 bgcolor=#fefefe
| 171727 ||  || — || November 20, 2000 || Socorro || LINEAR || — || align=right | 1.5 km || 
|-id=728 bgcolor=#fefefe
| 171728 ||  || — || November 21, 2000 || Socorro || LINEAR || — || align=right | 1.3 km || 
|-id=729 bgcolor=#fefefe
| 171729 ||  || — || November 20, 2000 || Socorro || LINEAR || V || align=right | 1.3 km || 
|-id=730 bgcolor=#FA8072
| 171730 ||  || — || November 20, 2000 || Socorro || LINEAR || — || align=right | 1.0 km || 
|-id=731 bgcolor=#fefefe
| 171731 ||  || — || November 20, 2000 || Socorro || LINEAR || — || align=right | 2.0 km || 
|-id=732 bgcolor=#fefefe
| 171732 ||  || — || November 28, 2000 || Kitt Peak || Spacewatch || — || align=right | 1.1 km || 
|-id=733 bgcolor=#fefefe
| 171733 ||  || — || November 19, 2000 || Socorro || LINEAR || V || align=right | 1.2 km || 
|-id=734 bgcolor=#fefefe
| 171734 ||  || — || November 20, 2000 || Socorro || LINEAR || — || align=right | 1.3 km || 
|-id=735 bgcolor=#fefefe
| 171735 ||  || — || November 21, 2000 || Socorro || LINEAR || — || align=right data-sort-value="0.99" | 990 m || 
|-id=736 bgcolor=#fefefe
| 171736 ||  || — || November 21, 2000 || Socorro || LINEAR || FLO || align=right | 1.3 km || 
|-id=737 bgcolor=#fefefe
| 171737 ||  || — || November 21, 2000 || Socorro || LINEAR || FLO || align=right | 1.4 km || 
|-id=738 bgcolor=#fefefe
| 171738 ||  || — || November 20, 2000 || Socorro || LINEAR || — || align=right | 1.3 km || 
|-id=739 bgcolor=#fefefe
| 171739 ||  || — || November 20, 2000 || Socorro || LINEAR || FLO || align=right | 1.2 km || 
|-id=740 bgcolor=#fefefe
| 171740 ||  || — || November 20, 2000 || Socorro || LINEAR || V || align=right | 1.3 km || 
|-id=741 bgcolor=#fefefe
| 171741 ||  || — || November 20, 2000 || Socorro || LINEAR || FLO || align=right | 1.3 km || 
|-id=742 bgcolor=#fefefe
| 171742 ||  || — || November 27, 2000 || Socorro || LINEAR || — || align=right | 1.3 km || 
|-id=743 bgcolor=#fefefe
| 171743 ||  || — || November 30, 2000 || Anderson Mesa || LONEOS || — || align=right data-sort-value="0.98" | 980 m || 
|-id=744 bgcolor=#fefefe
| 171744 ||  || — || November 20, 2000 || Socorro || LINEAR || — || align=right | 2.5 km || 
|-id=745 bgcolor=#d6d6d6
| 171745 || 2000 XU || — || December 1, 2000 || Kitt Peak || Spacewatch || 7:4 || align=right | 6.9 km || 
|-id=746 bgcolor=#fefefe
| 171746 ||  || — || December 4, 2000 || Socorro || LINEAR || — || align=right | 1.7 km || 
|-id=747 bgcolor=#fefefe
| 171747 ||  || — || December 4, 2000 || Socorro || LINEAR || FLO || align=right | 1.2 km || 
|-id=748 bgcolor=#fefefe
| 171748 ||  || — || December 19, 2000 || Socorro || LINEAR || KLI || align=right | 3.3 km || 
|-id=749 bgcolor=#fefefe
| 171749 ||  || — || December 20, 2000 || Socorro || LINEAR || — || align=right | 1.9 km || 
|-id=750 bgcolor=#fefefe
| 171750 ||  || — || December 22, 2000 || Socorro || LINEAR || V || align=right | 1.1 km || 
|-id=751 bgcolor=#fefefe
| 171751 ||  || — || December 22, 2000 || Socorro || LINEAR || PHO || align=right | 1.8 km || 
|-id=752 bgcolor=#fefefe
| 171752 ||  || — || December 29, 2000 || Desert Beaver || W. K. Y. Yeung || ERI || align=right | 2.9 km || 
|-id=753 bgcolor=#fefefe
| 171753 ||  || — || December 28, 2000 || Kitt Peak || Spacewatch || NYS || align=right data-sort-value="0.97" | 970 m || 
|-id=754 bgcolor=#fefefe
| 171754 ||  || — || December 28, 2000 || Kitt Peak || Spacewatch || V || align=right | 1.2 km || 
|-id=755 bgcolor=#fefefe
| 171755 ||  || — || December 30, 2000 || Socorro || LINEAR || NYS || align=right data-sort-value="0.94" | 940 m || 
|-id=756 bgcolor=#fefefe
| 171756 ||  || — || December 30, 2000 || Socorro || LINEAR || — || align=right | 1.7 km || 
|-id=757 bgcolor=#fefefe
| 171757 ||  || — || December 30, 2000 || Socorro || LINEAR || — || align=right | 1.2 km || 
|-id=758 bgcolor=#fefefe
| 171758 ||  || — || December 30, 2000 || Socorro || LINEAR || — || align=right | 1.3 km || 
|-id=759 bgcolor=#fefefe
| 171759 ||  || — || December 30, 2000 || Socorro || LINEAR || NYS || align=right | 1.0 km || 
|-id=760 bgcolor=#fefefe
| 171760 ||  || — || December 30, 2000 || Socorro || LINEAR || NYS || align=right | 1.0 km || 
|-id=761 bgcolor=#fefefe
| 171761 ||  || — || December 30, 2000 || Socorro || LINEAR || — || align=right | 2.1 km || 
|-id=762 bgcolor=#E9E9E9
| 171762 ||  || — || December 30, 2000 || Socorro || LINEAR || JUN || align=right | 5.2 km || 
|-id=763 bgcolor=#fefefe
| 171763 ||  || — || December 30, 2000 || Socorro || LINEAR || NYS || align=right data-sort-value="0.90" | 900 m || 
|-id=764 bgcolor=#fefefe
| 171764 ||  || — || December 30, 2000 || Socorro || LINEAR || — || align=right | 1.2 km || 
|-id=765 bgcolor=#fefefe
| 171765 ||  || — || December 30, 2000 || Desert Beaver || W. K. Y. Yeung || — || align=right | 1.3 km || 
|-id=766 bgcolor=#fefefe
| 171766 ||  || — || December 29, 2000 || Anderson Mesa || LONEOS || — || align=right | 1.5 km || 
|-id=767 bgcolor=#fefefe
| 171767 ||  || — || January 2, 2001 || Socorro || LINEAR || FLO || align=right | 1.2 km || 
|-id=768 bgcolor=#fefefe
| 171768 ||  || — || January 3, 2001 || Socorro || LINEAR || — || align=right | 1.2 km || 
|-id=769 bgcolor=#fefefe
| 171769 ||  || — || January 3, 2001 || Anderson Mesa || LONEOS || — || align=right | 1.4 km || 
|-id=770 bgcolor=#fefefe
| 171770 ||  || — || January 15, 2001 || Kitt Peak || Spacewatch || MAS || align=right | 1.2 km || 
|-id=771 bgcolor=#fefefe
| 171771 ||  || — || January 4, 2001 || Socorro || LINEAR || NYS || align=right data-sort-value="0.90" | 900 m || 
|-id=772 bgcolor=#fefefe
| 171772 ||  || — || January 19, 2001 || Socorro || LINEAR || — || align=right | 1.3 km || 
|-id=773 bgcolor=#fefefe
| 171773 ||  || — || January 17, 2001 || Oizumi || T. Kobayashi || — || align=right | 1.1 km || 
|-id=774 bgcolor=#fefefe
| 171774 ||  || — || January 19, 2001 || Socorro || LINEAR || — || align=right | 1.6 km || 
|-id=775 bgcolor=#fefefe
| 171775 ||  || — || January 19, 2001 || Socorro || LINEAR || — || align=right | 1.2 km || 
|-id=776 bgcolor=#fefefe
| 171776 ||  || — || January 20, 2001 || Socorro || LINEAR || — || align=right | 2.5 km || 
|-id=777 bgcolor=#fefefe
| 171777 ||  || — || January 20, 2001 || Socorro || LINEAR || — || align=right | 1.5 km || 
|-id=778 bgcolor=#fefefe
| 171778 ||  || — || January 20, 2001 || Socorro || LINEAR || — || align=right | 1.3 km || 
|-id=779 bgcolor=#fefefe
| 171779 ||  || — || January 18, 2001 || Socorro || LINEAR || — || align=right data-sort-value="0.86" | 860 m || 
|-id=780 bgcolor=#fefefe
| 171780 ||  || — || January 24, 2001 || Kitt Peak || Spacewatch || FLO || align=right | 1.2 km || 
|-id=781 bgcolor=#fefefe
| 171781 ||  || — || January 17, 2001 || Kitt Peak || Spacewatch || — || align=right | 1.3 km || 
|-id=782 bgcolor=#fefefe
| 171782 ||  || — || January 17, 2001 || Kitt Peak || Spacewatch || — || align=right | 1.3 km || 
|-id=783 bgcolor=#fefefe
| 171783 ||  || — || January 29, 2001 || Socorro || LINEAR || FLO || align=right | 1.3 km || 
|-id=784 bgcolor=#FA8072
| 171784 ||  || — || January 31, 2001 || Socorro || LINEAR || — || align=right | 1.4 km || 
|-id=785 bgcolor=#fefefe
| 171785 ||  || — || January 25, 2001 || Needville || W. G. Dillon || NYS || align=right data-sort-value="0.94" | 940 m || 
|-id=786 bgcolor=#fefefe
| 171786 ||  || — || January 21, 2001 || Socorro || LINEAR || — || align=right | 1.3 km || 
|-id=787 bgcolor=#fefefe
| 171787 ||  || — || February 1, 2001 || Socorro || LINEAR || — || align=right | 1.6 km || 
|-id=788 bgcolor=#fefefe
| 171788 ||  || — || February 1, 2001 || Socorro || LINEAR || — || align=right | 2.5 km || 
|-id=789 bgcolor=#fefefe
| 171789 ||  || — || February 1, 2001 || Socorro || LINEAR || NYS || align=right | 1.2 km || 
|-id=790 bgcolor=#fefefe
| 171790 ||  || — || February 1, 2001 || Socorro || LINEAR || NYS || align=right | 1.1 km || 
|-id=791 bgcolor=#fefefe
| 171791 ||  || — || February 1, 2001 || Socorro || LINEAR || — || align=right | 2.2 km || 
|-id=792 bgcolor=#fefefe
| 171792 ||  || — || February 13, 2001 || Socorro || LINEAR || — || align=right | 3.1 km || 
|-id=793 bgcolor=#fefefe
| 171793 ||  || — || February 13, 2001 || Socorro || LINEAR || FLO || align=right data-sort-value="0.84" | 840 m || 
|-id=794 bgcolor=#fefefe
| 171794 ||  || — || February 16, 2001 || Oizumi || T. Kobayashi || — || align=right | 1.6 km || 
|-id=795 bgcolor=#fefefe
| 171795 ||  || — || February 16, 2001 || Socorro || LINEAR || — || align=right | 1.4 km || 
|-id=796 bgcolor=#fefefe
| 171796 ||  || — || February 16, 2001 || Socorro || LINEAR || FLO || align=right | 1.1 km || 
|-id=797 bgcolor=#fefefe
| 171797 ||  || — || February 16, 2001 || Socorro || LINEAR || — || align=right | 1.7 km || 
|-id=798 bgcolor=#fefefe
| 171798 ||  || — || February 17, 2001 || Socorro || LINEAR || — || align=right | 1.5 km || 
|-id=799 bgcolor=#fefefe
| 171799 ||  || — || February 17, 2001 || Socorro || LINEAR || — || align=right | 3.0 km || 
|-id=800 bgcolor=#fefefe
| 171800 ||  || — || February 19, 2001 || Socorro || LINEAR || V || align=right | 1.2 km || 
|}

171801–171900 

|-bgcolor=#fefefe
| 171801 ||  || — || February 19, 2001 || Socorro || LINEAR || — || align=right | 1.2 km || 
|-id=802 bgcolor=#fefefe
| 171802 ||  || — || February 19, 2001 || Socorro || LINEAR || — || align=right | 1.5 km || 
|-id=803 bgcolor=#fefefe
| 171803 ||  || — || February 19, 2001 || Socorro || LINEAR || MAS || align=right | 1.3 km || 
|-id=804 bgcolor=#fefefe
| 171804 ||  || — || February 16, 2001 || Socorro || LINEAR || V || align=right | 1.2 km || 
|-id=805 bgcolor=#fefefe
| 171805 ||  || — || February 17, 2001 || Socorro || LINEAR || — || align=right | 1.8 km || 
|-id=806 bgcolor=#fefefe
| 171806 ||  || — || February 19, 2001 || Socorro || LINEAR || — || align=right data-sort-value="0.96" | 960 m || 
|-id=807 bgcolor=#fefefe
| 171807 ||  || — || February 19, 2001 || Socorro || LINEAR || ERI || align=right | 2.5 km || 
|-id=808 bgcolor=#fefefe
| 171808 ||  || — || February 21, 2001 || Kitt Peak || Spacewatch || — || align=right | 1.2 km || 
|-id=809 bgcolor=#fefefe
| 171809 ||  || — || February 25, 2001 || Ondřejov || P. Kušnirák || — || align=right | 1.0 km || 
|-id=810 bgcolor=#fefefe
| 171810 ||  || — || February 18, 2001 || Haleakala || NEAT || H || align=right | 1.2 km || 
|-id=811 bgcolor=#fefefe
| 171811 ||  || — || February 24, 2001 || Haleakala || NEAT || PHO || align=right | 1.8 km || 
|-id=812 bgcolor=#fefefe
| 171812 ||  || — || February 17, 2001 || Socorro || LINEAR || NYS || align=right data-sort-value="0.95" | 950 m || 
|-id=813 bgcolor=#fefefe
| 171813 ||  || — || February 16, 2001 || Socorro || LINEAR || PHO || align=right | 1.7 km || 
|-id=814 bgcolor=#fefefe
| 171814 ||  || — || February 16, 2001 || Črni Vrh || Črni Vrh || NYS || align=right data-sort-value="0.91" | 910 m || 
|-id=815 bgcolor=#fefefe
| 171815 ||  || — || March 2, 2001 || Anderson Mesa || LONEOS || — || align=right | 1.2 km || 
|-id=816 bgcolor=#fefefe
| 171816 ||  || — || March 15, 2001 || Haleakala || NEAT || — || align=right | 1.6 km || 
|-id=817 bgcolor=#fefefe
| 171817 ||  || — || March 15, 2001 || Kitt Peak || Spacewatch || — || align=right | 2.9 km || 
|-id=818 bgcolor=#fefefe
| 171818 ||  || — || March 18, 2001 || Socorro || LINEAR || MAS || align=right | 1.2 km || 
|-id=819 bgcolor=#FFC2E0
| 171819 ||  || — || March 18, 2001 || Anderson Mesa || LONEOS || AMO || align=right data-sort-value="0.77" | 770 m || 
|-id=820 bgcolor=#fefefe
| 171820 ||  || — || March 19, 2001 || Anderson Mesa || LONEOS || — || align=right | 1.8 km || 
|-id=821 bgcolor=#fefefe
| 171821 ||  || — || March 19, 2001 || Anderson Mesa || LONEOS || MAS || align=right data-sort-value="0.83" | 830 m || 
|-id=822 bgcolor=#fefefe
| 171822 ||  || — || March 19, 2001 || Anderson Mesa || LONEOS || — || align=right | 1.9 km || 
|-id=823 bgcolor=#fefefe
| 171823 ||  || — || March 18, 2001 || Socorro || LINEAR || — || align=right | 1.9 km || 
|-id=824 bgcolor=#fefefe
| 171824 ||  || — || March 18, 2001 || Socorro || LINEAR || MAS || align=right data-sort-value="0.96" | 960 m || 
|-id=825 bgcolor=#fefefe
| 171825 ||  || — || March 19, 2001 || Socorro || LINEAR || MAS || align=right | 1.4 km || 
|-id=826 bgcolor=#fefefe
| 171826 ||  || — || March 24, 2001 || Socorro || LINEAR || NYS || align=right data-sort-value="0.86" | 860 m || 
|-id=827 bgcolor=#fefefe
| 171827 ||  || — || March 16, 2001 || Socorro || LINEAR || — || align=right | 3.2 km || 
|-id=828 bgcolor=#fefefe
| 171828 ||  || — || March 18, 2001 || Socorro || LINEAR || ERI || align=right | 3.5 km || 
|-id=829 bgcolor=#fefefe
| 171829 ||  || — || March 18, 2001 || Anderson Mesa || LONEOS || FLO || align=right | 1.3 km || 
|-id=830 bgcolor=#fefefe
| 171830 ||  || — || March 18, 2001 || Socorro || LINEAR || — || align=right | 1.6 km || 
|-id=831 bgcolor=#fefefe
| 171831 ||  || — || March 24, 2001 || Kitt Peak || Spacewatch || — || align=right | 1.5 km || 
|-id=832 bgcolor=#fefefe
| 171832 ||  || — || March 26, 2001 || Socorro || LINEAR || — || align=right | 1.2 km || 
|-id=833 bgcolor=#fefefe
| 171833 ||  || — || March 29, 2001 || Haleakala || NEAT || NYS || align=right | 3.4 km || 
|-id=834 bgcolor=#E9E9E9
| 171834 ||  || — || March 21, 2001 || Kitt Peak || Spacewatch || — || align=right | 1.9 km || 
|-id=835 bgcolor=#E9E9E9
| 171835 ||  || — || April 15, 2001 || Socorro || LINEAR || — || align=right | 4.1 km || 
|-id=836 bgcolor=#E9E9E9
| 171836 ||  || — || April 27, 2001 || Socorro || LINEAR || — || align=right | 2.3 km || 
|-id=837 bgcolor=#E9E9E9
| 171837 ||  || — || April 23, 2001 || Socorro || LINEAR || — || align=right | 2.7 km || 
|-id=838 bgcolor=#E9E9E9
| 171838 ||  || — || April 24, 2001 || Socorro || LINEAR || — || align=right | 1.6 km || 
|-id=839 bgcolor=#FFC2E0
| 171839 ||  || — || May 12, 2001 || Haleakala || NEAT || APOPHA || align=right data-sort-value="0.55" | 550 m || 
|-id=840 bgcolor=#E9E9E9
| 171840 ||  || — || May 15, 2001 || Anderson Mesa || LONEOS || — || align=right | 1.9 km || 
|-id=841 bgcolor=#E9E9E9
| 171841 ||  || — || May 15, 2001 || Anderson Mesa || LONEOS || — || align=right | 3.2 km || 
|-id=842 bgcolor=#E9E9E9
| 171842 ||  || — || May 18, 2001 || Socorro || LINEAR || — || align=right | 2.7 km || 
|-id=843 bgcolor=#E9E9E9
| 171843 ||  || — || May 17, 2001 || Socorro || LINEAR || — || align=right | 4.8 km || 
|-id=844 bgcolor=#E9E9E9
| 171844 ||  || — || May 21, 2001 || Socorro || LINEAR || GER || align=right | 2.2 km || 
|-id=845 bgcolor=#E9E9E9
| 171845 ||  || — || May 18, 2001 || Socorro || LINEAR || — || align=right | 1.7 km || 
|-id=846 bgcolor=#E9E9E9
| 171846 ||  || — || May 21, 2001 || Socorro || LINEAR || — || align=right | 3.3 km || 
|-id=847 bgcolor=#E9E9E9
| 171847 ||  || — || May 22, 2001 || Socorro || LINEAR || EUN || align=right | 2.6 km || 
|-id=848 bgcolor=#E9E9E9
| 171848 ||  || — || May 23, 2001 || Socorro || LINEAR || — || align=right | 2.1 km || 
|-id=849 bgcolor=#E9E9E9
| 171849 ||  || — || May 24, 2001 || Kitt Peak || Spacewatch || — || align=right | 1.9 km || 
|-id=850 bgcolor=#E9E9E9
| 171850 ||  || — || June 12, 2001 || Anderson Mesa || LONEOS || — || align=right | 4.8 km || 
|-id=851 bgcolor=#d6d6d6
| 171851 || 2001 MG || — || June 16, 2001 || Desert Beaver || W. K. Y. Yeung || — || align=right | 5.4 km || 
|-id=852 bgcolor=#E9E9E9
| 171852 ||  || — || June 16, 2001 || Socorro || LINEAR || — || align=right | 1.9 km || 
|-id=853 bgcolor=#E9E9E9
| 171853 ||  || — || June 26, 2001 || Kitt Peak || Spacewatch || HNS || align=right | 2.0 km || 
|-id=854 bgcolor=#E9E9E9
| 171854 ||  || — || June 25, 2001 || Palomar || NEAT || — || align=right | 1.9 km || 
|-id=855 bgcolor=#E9E9E9
| 171855 ||  || — || June 25, 2001 || Palomar || NEAT || MRX || align=right | 1.7 km || 
|-id=856 bgcolor=#E9E9E9
| 171856 ||  || — || July 13, 2001 || Palomar || NEAT || — || align=right | 2.3 km || 
|-id=857 bgcolor=#d6d6d6
| 171857 ||  || — || July 20, 2001 || Palomar || NEAT || — || align=right | 5.0 km || 
|-id=858 bgcolor=#d6d6d6
| 171858 ||  || — || July 22, 2001 || Palomar || NEAT || — || align=right | 4.1 km || 
|-id=859 bgcolor=#E9E9E9
| 171859 ||  || — || July 21, 2001 || Palomar || NEAT || NEM || align=right | 3.6 km || 
|-id=860 bgcolor=#d6d6d6
| 171860 ||  || — || July 25, 2001 || Haleakala || NEAT || — || align=right | 4.5 km || 
|-id=861 bgcolor=#E9E9E9
| 171861 ||  || — || July 28, 2001 || Haleakala || NEAT || — || align=right | 5.0 km || 
|-id=862 bgcolor=#d6d6d6
| 171862 ||  || — || August 13, 2001 || Palomar || NEAT || — || align=right | 6.7 km || 
|-id=863 bgcolor=#d6d6d6
| 171863 ||  || — || August 16, 2001 || Socorro || LINEAR || — || align=right | 4.4 km || 
|-id=864 bgcolor=#d6d6d6
| 171864 ||  || — || August 16, 2001 || Socorro || LINEAR || — || align=right | 4.1 km || 
|-id=865 bgcolor=#d6d6d6
| 171865 ||  || — || August 16, 2001 || Palomar || NEAT || — || align=right | 6.5 km || 
|-id=866 bgcolor=#d6d6d6
| 171866 ||  || — || August 20, 2001 || Palomar || NEAT || — || align=right | 6.4 km || 
|-id=867 bgcolor=#d6d6d6
| 171867 ||  || — || August 17, 2001 || Socorro || LINEAR || — || align=right | 6.0 km || 
|-id=868 bgcolor=#d6d6d6
| 171868 ||  || — || August 24, 2001 || Ondřejov || P. Kušnirák, P. Pravec || KOR || align=right | 2.1 km || 
|-id=869 bgcolor=#d6d6d6
| 171869 ||  || — || August 17, 2001 || Socorro || LINEAR || — || align=right | 4.5 km || 
|-id=870 bgcolor=#d6d6d6
| 171870 ||  || — || August 19, 2001 || Socorro || LINEAR || — || align=right | 4.8 km || 
|-id=871 bgcolor=#d6d6d6
| 171871 ||  || — || August 23, 2001 || Anderson Mesa || LONEOS || EOS || align=right | 3.9 km || 
|-id=872 bgcolor=#d6d6d6
| 171872 ||  || — || August 25, 2001 || Socorro || LINEAR || — || align=right | 5.9 km || 
|-id=873 bgcolor=#d6d6d6
| 171873 ||  || — || August 22, 2001 || Palomar || NEAT || — || align=right | 6.0 km || 
|-id=874 bgcolor=#d6d6d6
| 171874 ||  || — || August 23, 2001 || Anderson Mesa || LONEOS || KOR || align=right | 2.5 km || 
|-id=875 bgcolor=#d6d6d6
| 171875 ||  || — || August 23, 2001 || Socorro || LINEAR || — || align=right | 7.0 km || 
|-id=876 bgcolor=#d6d6d6
| 171876 ||  || — || August 24, 2001 || Anderson Mesa || LONEOS || EOS || align=right | 3.0 km || 
|-id=877 bgcolor=#d6d6d6
| 171877 ||  || — || August 24, 2001 || Anderson Mesa || LONEOS || EOS || align=right | 3.3 km || 
|-id=878 bgcolor=#d6d6d6
| 171878 ||  || — || August 25, 2001 || Socorro || LINEAR || — || align=right | 4.5 km || 
|-id=879 bgcolor=#d6d6d6
| 171879 ||  || — || August 25, 2001 || Socorro || LINEAR || — || align=right | 6.4 km || 
|-id=880 bgcolor=#d6d6d6
| 171880 ||  || — || August 19, 2001 || Socorro || LINEAR || — || align=right | 4.9 km || 
|-id=881 bgcolor=#d6d6d6
| 171881 ||  || — || August 23, 2001 || Haleakala || NEAT || — || align=right | 4.5 km || 
|-id=882 bgcolor=#d6d6d6
| 171882 ||  || — || August 16, 2001 || Socorro || LINEAR || THM || align=right | 3.7 km || 
|-id=883 bgcolor=#d6d6d6
| 171883 ||  || — || August 26, 2001 || Palomar || NEAT || THB || align=right | 7.6 km || 
|-id=884 bgcolor=#d6d6d6
| 171884 ||  || — || August 16, 2001 || Socorro || LINEAR || — || align=right | 3.4 km || 
|-id=885 bgcolor=#d6d6d6
| 171885 ||  || — || August 20, 2001 || Palomar || NEAT || URS || align=right | 6.2 km || 
|-id=886 bgcolor=#d6d6d6
| 171886 ||  || — || September 9, 2001 || Anderson Mesa || LONEOS || — || align=right | 5.2 km || 
|-id=887 bgcolor=#E9E9E9
| 171887 ||  || — || September 10, 2001 || Socorro || LINEAR || — || align=right | 4.4 km || 
|-id=888 bgcolor=#d6d6d6
| 171888 ||  || — || September 7, 2001 || Socorro || LINEAR || — || align=right | 3.9 km || 
|-id=889 bgcolor=#E9E9E9
| 171889 ||  || — || September 7, 2001 || Socorro || LINEAR || HOF || align=right | 5.6 km || 
|-id=890 bgcolor=#d6d6d6
| 171890 ||  || — || September 11, 2001 || Socorro || LINEAR || — || align=right | 4.3 km || 
|-id=891 bgcolor=#d6d6d6
| 171891 ||  || — || September 11, 2001 || Socorro || LINEAR || — || align=right | 7.6 km || 
|-id=892 bgcolor=#d6d6d6
| 171892 ||  || — || September 11, 2001 || Socorro || LINEAR || EUP || align=right | 5.9 km || 
|-id=893 bgcolor=#d6d6d6
| 171893 ||  || — || September 10, 2001 || Socorro || LINEAR || — || align=right | 4.2 km || 
|-id=894 bgcolor=#d6d6d6
| 171894 ||  || — || September 11, 2001 || Anderson Mesa || LONEOS || — || align=right | 4.3 km || 
|-id=895 bgcolor=#d6d6d6
| 171895 ||  || — || September 11, 2001 || Anderson Mesa || LONEOS || EOS || align=right | 3.2 km || 
|-id=896 bgcolor=#d6d6d6
| 171896 ||  || — || September 11, 2001 || Anderson Mesa || LONEOS || THM || align=right | 3.2 km || 
|-id=897 bgcolor=#d6d6d6
| 171897 ||  || — || September 11, 2001 || Anderson Mesa || LONEOS || — || align=right | 4.7 km || 
|-id=898 bgcolor=#d6d6d6
| 171898 ||  || — || September 11, 2001 || Anderson Mesa || LONEOS || — || align=right | 4.4 km || 
|-id=899 bgcolor=#d6d6d6
| 171899 ||  || — || September 12, 2001 || Kitt Peak || Spacewatch || — || align=right | 3.4 km || 
|-id=900 bgcolor=#E9E9E9
| 171900 ||  || — || September 12, 2001 || Socorro || LINEAR || — || align=right | 3.7 km || 
|}

171901–172000 

|-bgcolor=#E9E9E9
| 171901 ||  || — || September 12, 2001 || Socorro || LINEAR || — || align=right | 3.6 km || 
|-id=902 bgcolor=#d6d6d6
| 171902 ||  || — || September 12, 2001 || Socorro || LINEAR || — || align=right | 4.3 km || 
|-id=903 bgcolor=#d6d6d6
| 171903 ||  || — || September 12, 2001 || Socorro || LINEAR || — || align=right | 3.7 km || 
|-id=904 bgcolor=#d6d6d6
| 171904 ||  || — || September 11, 2001 || Anderson Mesa || LONEOS || — || align=right | 3.3 km || 
|-id=905 bgcolor=#d6d6d6
| 171905 ||  || — || September 16, 2001 || Socorro || LINEAR || — || align=right | 4.0 km || 
|-id=906 bgcolor=#d6d6d6
| 171906 ||  || — || September 16, 2001 || Socorro || LINEAR || HYG || align=right | 3.7 km || 
|-id=907 bgcolor=#d6d6d6
| 171907 ||  || — || September 16, 2001 || Socorro || LINEAR || — || align=right | 4.1 km || 
|-id=908 bgcolor=#d6d6d6
| 171908 ||  || — || September 16, 2001 || Socorro || LINEAR || — || align=right | 4.0 km || 
|-id=909 bgcolor=#d6d6d6
| 171909 ||  || — || September 16, 2001 || Socorro || LINEAR || — || align=right | 5.3 km || 
|-id=910 bgcolor=#d6d6d6
| 171910 ||  || — || September 16, 2001 || Socorro || LINEAR || — || align=right | 4.8 km || 
|-id=911 bgcolor=#d6d6d6
| 171911 ||  || — || September 16, 2001 || Socorro || LINEAR || — || align=right | 5.1 km || 
|-id=912 bgcolor=#d6d6d6
| 171912 ||  || — || September 17, 2001 || Socorro || LINEAR || — || align=right | 4.6 km || 
|-id=913 bgcolor=#d6d6d6
| 171913 ||  || — || September 19, 2001 || Anderson Mesa || LONEOS || — || align=right | 5.3 km || 
|-id=914 bgcolor=#d6d6d6
| 171914 ||  || — || September 19, 2001 || Anderson Mesa || LONEOS || — || align=right | 6.7 km || 
|-id=915 bgcolor=#d6d6d6
| 171915 ||  || — || September 20, 2001 || Socorro || LINEAR || — || align=right | 5.3 km || 
|-id=916 bgcolor=#d6d6d6
| 171916 ||  || — || September 20, 2001 || Socorro || LINEAR || KOR || align=right | 2.4 km || 
|-id=917 bgcolor=#d6d6d6
| 171917 ||  || — || September 20, 2001 || Socorro || LINEAR || — || align=right | 3.8 km || 
|-id=918 bgcolor=#d6d6d6
| 171918 ||  || — || September 20, 2001 || Socorro || LINEAR || EOS || align=right | 4.1 km || 
|-id=919 bgcolor=#d6d6d6
| 171919 ||  || — || September 20, 2001 || Desert Eagle || W. K. Y. Yeung || — || align=right | 3.4 km || 
|-id=920 bgcolor=#d6d6d6
| 171920 ||  || — || September 16, 2001 || Socorro || LINEAR || — || align=right | 3.5 km || 
|-id=921 bgcolor=#d6d6d6
| 171921 ||  || — || September 16, 2001 || Socorro || LINEAR || — || align=right | 6.8 km || 
|-id=922 bgcolor=#d6d6d6
| 171922 ||  || — || September 16, 2001 || Socorro || LINEAR || — || align=right | 5.2 km || 
|-id=923 bgcolor=#d6d6d6
| 171923 ||  || — || September 16, 2001 || Socorro || LINEAR || — || align=right | 4.9 km || 
|-id=924 bgcolor=#d6d6d6
| 171924 ||  || — || September 16, 2001 || Socorro || LINEAR || HYG || align=right | 4.4 km || 
|-id=925 bgcolor=#d6d6d6
| 171925 ||  || — || September 16, 2001 || Socorro || LINEAR || — || align=right | 4.8 km || 
|-id=926 bgcolor=#E9E9E9
| 171926 ||  || — || September 16, 2001 || Socorro || LINEAR || AGN || align=right | 2.3 km || 
|-id=927 bgcolor=#d6d6d6
| 171927 ||  || — || September 16, 2001 || Socorro || LINEAR || HYG || align=right | 5.3 km || 
|-id=928 bgcolor=#d6d6d6
| 171928 ||  || — || September 17, 2001 || Socorro || LINEAR || HYG || align=right | 4.8 km || 
|-id=929 bgcolor=#d6d6d6
| 171929 ||  || — || September 17, 2001 || Socorro || LINEAR || — || align=right | 5.3 km || 
|-id=930 bgcolor=#d6d6d6
| 171930 ||  || — || September 16, 2001 || Socorro || LINEAR || — || align=right | 4.2 km || 
|-id=931 bgcolor=#d6d6d6
| 171931 ||  || — || September 16, 2001 || Socorro || LINEAR || — || align=right | 2.9 km || 
|-id=932 bgcolor=#d6d6d6
| 171932 ||  || — || September 19, 2001 || Socorro || LINEAR || — || align=right | 6.3 km || 
|-id=933 bgcolor=#d6d6d6
| 171933 ||  || — || September 19, 2001 || Socorro || LINEAR || — || align=right | 5.1 km || 
|-id=934 bgcolor=#d6d6d6
| 171934 ||  || — || September 19, 2001 || Socorro || LINEAR || — || align=right | 3.3 km || 
|-id=935 bgcolor=#d6d6d6
| 171935 ||  || — || September 19, 2001 || Socorro || LINEAR || — || align=right | 3.7 km || 
|-id=936 bgcolor=#d6d6d6
| 171936 ||  || — || September 19, 2001 || Socorro || LINEAR || THM || align=right | 3.9 km || 
|-id=937 bgcolor=#d6d6d6
| 171937 ||  || — || September 19, 2001 || Socorro || LINEAR || — || align=right | 4.1 km || 
|-id=938 bgcolor=#d6d6d6
| 171938 ||  || — || September 19, 2001 || Socorro || LINEAR || — || align=right | 5.0 km || 
|-id=939 bgcolor=#d6d6d6
| 171939 ||  || — || September 19, 2001 || Socorro || LINEAR || — || align=right | 5.9 km || 
|-id=940 bgcolor=#d6d6d6
| 171940 ||  || — || September 19, 2001 || Socorro || LINEAR || — || align=right | 3.1 km || 
|-id=941 bgcolor=#d6d6d6
| 171941 ||  || — || September 19, 2001 || Socorro || LINEAR || — || align=right | 5.2 km || 
|-id=942 bgcolor=#d6d6d6
| 171942 ||  || — || September 19, 2001 || Socorro || LINEAR || — || align=right | 4.3 km || 
|-id=943 bgcolor=#d6d6d6
| 171943 ||  || — || September 19, 2001 || Socorro || LINEAR || EOS || align=right | 4.8 km || 
|-id=944 bgcolor=#d6d6d6
| 171944 ||  || — || September 20, 2001 || Socorro || LINEAR || — || align=right | 4.1 km || 
|-id=945 bgcolor=#d6d6d6
| 171945 ||  || — || September 25, 2001 || Desert Eagle || W. K. Y. Yeung || VER || align=right | 4.9 km || 
|-id=946 bgcolor=#d6d6d6
| 171946 ||  || — || September 21, 2001 || Anderson Mesa || LONEOS || — || align=right | 5.3 km || 
|-id=947 bgcolor=#d6d6d6
| 171947 ||  || — || September 21, 2001 || Anderson Mesa || LONEOS || HYG || align=right | 4.8 km || 
|-id=948 bgcolor=#d6d6d6
| 171948 ||  || — || September 27, 2001 || Palomar || NEAT || LIX || align=right | 5.3 km || 
|-id=949 bgcolor=#d6d6d6
| 171949 ||  || — || September 21, 2001 || Socorro || LINEAR || — || align=right | 5.7 km || 
|-id=950 bgcolor=#d6d6d6
| 171950 ||  || — || September 19, 2001 || Socorro || LINEAR || — || align=right | 4.0 km || 
|-id=951 bgcolor=#d6d6d6
| 171951 ||  || — || September 19, 2001 || Anderson Mesa || LONEOS || — || align=right | 3.9 km || 
|-id=952 bgcolor=#E9E9E9
| 171952 ||  || — || September 21, 2001 || Anderson Mesa || LONEOS || ADE || align=right | 5.0 km || 
|-id=953 bgcolor=#d6d6d6
| 171953 ||  || — || September 23, 2001 || Palomar || NEAT || — || align=right | 4.4 km || 
|-id=954 bgcolor=#d6d6d6
| 171954 ||  || — || September 26, 2001 || Socorro || LINEAR || CRO || align=right | 4.7 km || 
|-id=955 bgcolor=#d6d6d6
| 171955 ||  || — || September 20, 2001 || Socorro || LINEAR || — || align=right | 5.9 km || 
|-id=956 bgcolor=#d6d6d6
| 171956 ||  || — || October 13, 2001 || Socorro || LINEAR || THM || align=right | 3.5 km || 
|-id=957 bgcolor=#d6d6d6
| 171957 ||  || — || October 13, 2001 || Socorro || LINEAR || — || align=right | 4.3 km || 
|-id=958 bgcolor=#d6d6d6
| 171958 ||  || — || October 14, 2001 || Socorro || LINEAR || EOS || align=right | 3.2 km || 
|-id=959 bgcolor=#d6d6d6
| 171959 ||  || — || October 13, 2001 || Socorro || LINEAR || HYG || align=right | 4.7 km || 
|-id=960 bgcolor=#d6d6d6
| 171960 ||  || — || October 13, 2001 || Socorro || LINEAR || THM || align=right | 3.7 km || 
|-id=961 bgcolor=#d6d6d6
| 171961 ||  || — || October 14, 2001 || Socorro || LINEAR || HYG || align=right | 4.4 km || 
|-id=962 bgcolor=#d6d6d6
| 171962 ||  || — || October 14, 2001 || Socorro || LINEAR || — || align=right | 4.5 km || 
|-id=963 bgcolor=#d6d6d6
| 171963 ||  || — || October 14, 2001 || Socorro || LINEAR || EOS || align=right | 5.8 km || 
|-id=964 bgcolor=#d6d6d6
| 171964 ||  || — || October 14, 2001 || Socorro || LINEAR || — || align=right | 5.4 km || 
|-id=965 bgcolor=#d6d6d6
| 171965 ||  || — || October 14, 2001 || Socorro || LINEAR || — || align=right | 6.1 km || 
|-id=966 bgcolor=#d6d6d6
| 171966 ||  || — || October 14, 2001 || Socorro || LINEAR || EMA || align=right | 5.7 km || 
|-id=967 bgcolor=#d6d6d6
| 171967 ||  || — || October 14, 2001 || Socorro || LINEAR || EOS || align=right | 3.5 km || 
|-id=968 bgcolor=#d6d6d6
| 171968 ||  || — || October 14, 2001 || Socorro || LINEAR || — || align=right | 5.6 km || 
|-id=969 bgcolor=#d6d6d6
| 171969 ||  || — || October 14, 2001 || Socorro || LINEAR || — || align=right | 6.0 km || 
|-id=970 bgcolor=#d6d6d6
| 171970 ||  || — || October 15, 2001 || Socorro || LINEAR || — || align=right | 6.5 km || 
|-id=971 bgcolor=#d6d6d6
| 171971 ||  || — || October 15, 2001 || Socorro || LINEAR || EOS || align=right | 3.5 km || 
|-id=972 bgcolor=#d6d6d6
| 171972 ||  || — || October 15, 2001 || Socorro || LINEAR || ALA || align=right | 6.3 km || 
|-id=973 bgcolor=#d6d6d6
| 171973 ||  || — || October 15, 2001 || Socorro || LINEAR || EUP || align=right | 6.5 km || 
|-id=974 bgcolor=#d6d6d6
| 171974 ||  || — || October 12, 2001 || Haleakala || NEAT || EOS || align=right | 3.5 km || 
|-id=975 bgcolor=#d6d6d6
| 171975 ||  || — || October 10, 2001 || Palomar || NEAT || — || align=right | 4.5 km || 
|-id=976 bgcolor=#d6d6d6
| 171976 ||  || — || October 13, 2001 || Palomar || NEAT || — || align=right | 4.7 km || 
|-id=977 bgcolor=#d6d6d6
| 171977 ||  || — || October 13, 2001 || Palomar || NEAT || — || align=right | 4.4 km || 
|-id=978 bgcolor=#d6d6d6
| 171978 ||  || — || October 13, 2001 || Palomar || NEAT || LIX || align=right | 5.6 km || 
|-id=979 bgcolor=#d6d6d6
| 171979 ||  || — || October 13, 2001 || Palomar || NEAT || — || align=right | 5.8 km || 
|-id=980 bgcolor=#d6d6d6
| 171980 ||  || — || October 10, 2001 || Palomar || NEAT || — || align=right | 8.0 km || 
|-id=981 bgcolor=#d6d6d6
| 171981 ||  || — || October 10, 2001 || Palomar || NEAT || — || align=right | 4.8 km || 
|-id=982 bgcolor=#d6d6d6
| 171982 ||  || — || October 10, 2001 || Palomar || NEAT || LIX || align=right | 6.6 km || 
|-id=983 bgcolor=#d6d6d6
| 171983 ||  || — || October 11, 2001 || Palomar || NEAT || — || align=right | 3.2 km || 
|-id=984 bgcolor=#d6d6d6
| 171984 ||  || — || October 14, 2001 || Socorro || LINEAR || HYG || align=right | 3.5 km || 
|-id=985 bgcolor=#d6d6d6
| 171985 ||  || — || October 14, 2001 || Socorro || LINEAR || — || align=right | 4.9 km || 
|-id=986 bgcolor=#d6d6d6
| 171986 ||  || — || October 14, 2001 || Socorro || LINEAR || HYG || align=right | 9.4 km || 
|-id=987 bgcolor=#d6d6d6
| 171987 ||  || — || October 11, 2001 || Socorro || LINEAR || — || align=right | 5.4 km || 
|-id=988 bgcolor=#d6d6d6
| 171988 ||  || — || October 11, 2001 || Socorro || LINEAR || — || align=right | 5.5 km || 
|-id=989 bgcolor=#d6d6d6
| 171989 ||  || — || October 11, 2001 || Socorro || LINEAR || LIX || align=right | 7.1 km || 
|-id=990 bgcolor=#d6d6d6
| 171990 ||  || — || October 12, 2001 || Anderson Mesa || LONEOS || — || align=right | 6.4 km || 
|-id=991 bgcolor=#d6d6d6
| 171991 ||  || — || October 13, 2001 || Palomar || NEAT || EOS || align=right | 3.5 km || 
|-id=992 bgcolor=#d6d6d6
| 171992 ||  || — || October 13, 2001 || Palomar || NEAT || — || align=right | 5.0 km || 
|-id=993 bgcolor=#d6d6d6
| 171993 ||  || — || October 13, 2001 || Palomar || NEAT || — || align=right | 5.1 km || 
|-id=994 bgcolor=#d6d6d6
| 171994 ||  || — || October 14, 2001 || Anderson Mesa || LONEOS || — || align=right | 4.8 km || 
|-id=995 bgcolor=#d6d6d6
| 171995 ||  || — || October 15, 2001 || Haleakala || NEAT || — || align=right | 4.5 km || 
|-id=996 bgcolor=#d6d6d6
| 171996 ||  || — || October 15, 2001 || Palomar || NEAT || — || align=right | 5.6 km || 
|-id=997 bgcolor=#d6d6d6
| 171997 ||  || — || October 14, 2001 || Haleakala || NEAT || TIR || align=right | 5.8 km || 
|-id=998 bgcolor=#d6d6d6
| 171998 ||  || — || October 16, 2001 || Socorro || LINEAR || HYG || align=right | 5.6 km || 
|-id=999 bgcolor=#d6d6d6
| 171999 ||  || — || October 17, 2001 || Socorro || LINEAR || EOS || align=right | 5.4 km || 
|-id=000 bgcolor=#d6d6d6
| 172000 ||  || — || October 17, 2001 || Socorro || LINEAR || TEL || align=right | 3.0 km || 
|}

References

External links 
 Discovery Circumstances: Numbered Minor Planets (170001)–(175000) (IAU Minor Planet Center)

0171